= Apostles (Manichaeism) =

Early manichaean leaders

Mani, the founder of Manichaeism, had 12 Apostles like Jesus.

These are some of the known apostles.

- Mar Ammo, Apostle to the Sogdians
- Mar Sisin, the first Manichaean Pope
- possibly Mar Zaku, who may alternatively have been in the second generation
- Mar Adda, who preached in the Roman Empire
