= Archegos =

Archegos may refer to:

- Archegos (Manichaeism), the head of the Manichaean religion
- Archegos Capital Management, a limited partnership family office that managed the personal assets of Bill Hwang from 2013 to 2021
