= Manichaean schisms =

- Date: sixth century – tenth century
- Also known as: East–West Schism of Manichaean Church
- Type: Religious schism
- Cause: Regional difference

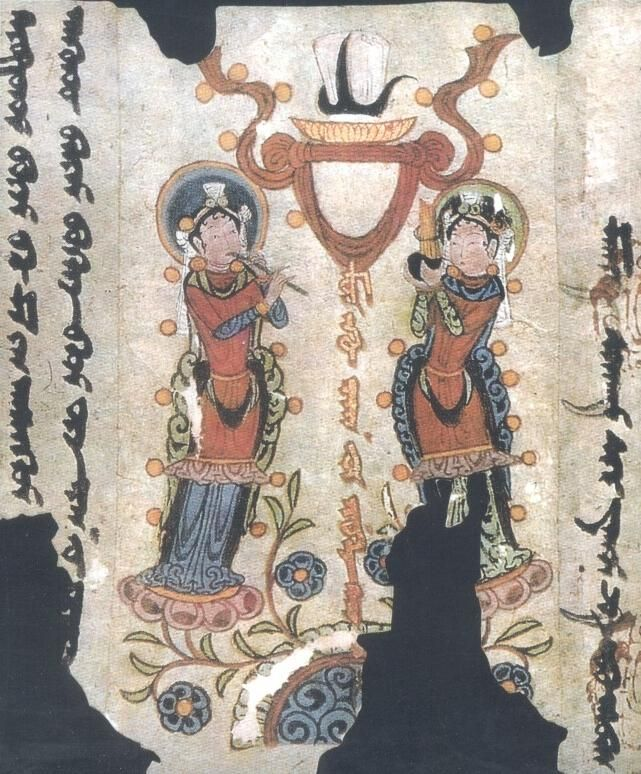
illustration of the god of music from the early 11th-century Sogdian-language Manichaean letter found at the Bezeklik Caves

Although Manichaeism has historically been a fairly unified religion, it has had some schisms over its history. These schisms occurred from the sixth century AD until at least the 10th century AD.

In the sixth century, there was a schism among Manichaeans between the Denawars and the see of Babylon, in response to persecution in Mesopotamia. The see of Babylon was the predominant sect of the Middle East, while the Denawars were prevalent in Sogdiana and founded by Shad Ohrmazd; however, they viewed Mar Ammo as their founder since he established Manichaeism in the region. The rift between the eastern and western Manichaeans was not caused by any doctrinal matters. The seat of the Archegos remained in Seleucia-Ctesiphon, but the influence on Manichaeism mostly came from Transoxiana.

After the Arab victory at the Battle of al-Qadisiyyah, the Manichaeans had a brief respite from persecution. As a result, some returned to Mesopotamia from Khorasan.

The capital of the Denawars by the eighth century was centered in Qocho on the northern Silk Road. At the time it was active from at least Samarkand to Chang'an. The schism between the eastern and western churches was worked out and ended by the beginning of the eighth century.

At the end of the seventh century, Mihr was Archegos and the schism was reconciled. Mihr had relaxed many rules of Manichaeism regarding social relationship (Arabic wisallat). Mihr was succeeded by Zad Hurmuz, who in turn was succeeded by Miqlās. Miqlās attempted to restrict these rules once again, and this resulted in the development of a new schism between the Miqlāsiyya, who wanted the rules to be strict, and the Mihriyya, who wanted them to be loose.

The rise of the Abbasid Caliphate brought increased persecution in 750. Due to this persecution, the center of Manichaeism permanently shifted to Khorasan. Letters from Khorasan show the Miqlāsiyya-Mihriyya schism was still strong in 880.

Manichaeism, following its introduction into Sogdiana, would be spread in part by Sogdians eastward into the Tarim Basin and China. Manichaeism continues to be practiced despite a long history of persecution in China, though it became increasingly syncretic, and confined to southeastern China after the 14th century.

== Notes ==
=== Works cited ===
- BeDuhn, Jason (2000), The Manichaean Body: In Discipline and Ritual, Johns Hopkins University Press, ISBN 0-8018-7107-7
- Whitfield, Susan (1999), Life along the Silk Road, University of California Press, ISBN 0-520-22472-8
- Wood, Francis (2002), The Silk Road: Two Thousand Years in the Heart of Asia, University of California Press, ISBN 0-520-23786-2
