= Seduction of the Archons (Manichaeism) =

The Seduction of the Archons story within the Manichaean canon is part of the Third Creation, the third and final phase of the three-phase Manichaean creation narrative.

== Narrative ==
The details of the Seduction of the Archons differ depending on the source used. Here there are a number of sources used to articulate a working narrative: Augustine of Hippo's polemic report of the Manichaean cosmology, The Nature of The Good, quoting the seventh book of the prophet Mani's own Book of Mysteries; Ephrem the Syrian's Prose Refutations of Mani; the English translation Prods Oktor Sjaervo provides of portions of Mani's own Shabuhragan; Al-Biruni's Ketāb taḥqiq mā le'l-hend India; Theodore bar Konai's 8th century Syriac Ketba de-Skolion; as well as the articulation Hans Jonas provides in The Gnostic Religion: The Message of the Alien God—which articulates its version of the Seduction from the Acta Archelai and the writings of Alexander of Lycopolis, Titus of Bostra, Severus of Antiochia, Theodoret, and Augustine of Hippo—and the summary John C. Reeves provides in Prologemena to a History of Islamicate Manichaeism.

After the Second Creation, which created the physical universe—the stars, the sun, the moon, the ten heavens and the eight earths—the Father of Greatness bound many great demons from the realm of darkness—called the archons—within the heavens, for the sake of recovering the light that they had swallowed from the World of Light. The Mother of Life, Primal Man, and the Living Spirit then call to the Father of Greatness to liberate the light from the archons. A complex process of extracting the light from the two-hundred captive archons then follows. The Father creates a being of light called the Third Messenger, which calls upon the Virgins of Light. The Virgins of Light, or the Messenger themself, then perform sensually towards the archons, taking on boyish forms towards the female archons and the forms of beautiful women towards the male archons. Inflamed with lust towards the creature(s) of light, the male archons ejaculate and the female archons miscarry, a mixture of light and darkness interred in both materials. The ejaculate of the male archons rains down upon the earth, creating the first plants, and the miscarriages fall down, becoming animals and monstrous "abortions." The "abortions" feed upon the plants and riot across the surface of the earth, dispersing light throughout the material realm further. Through acts of cannibalism and complex sexual intercourse, they created the first material human beings—Adam and Eve—in the remembered images of the transgender Messenger.

Interpretations of these events differ. A significant portion of the sources used were produced as polemical criticism of Manichaean doctrine.

== Preceding Seductions ==
The individual story of Seduction of the Archons manifested in the Third Creation is not the only Seduction present within the Manichaean canon. Theodore bar-Konai's account of Manichaean cosmology includes at least one Seduction prior to the one present in the Third Creation, performed by the Living Spirit. Additionally, some versions of the descent of Original Man into the realm of darkness frame it as a seduction rather than as a military advancement: in the Coptic Psalm-Book a masculine Original Man presents his transgender soul, a feminine Maiden, to the forces of darkness in an effort to seduce them. Augustine also refers to the mutability of Original Man's gender within the Manichaean creation myth in his Contra Faustum.
