= Mar Sisin =

Manichaean leader

Mar Sisin (Syriac: Mār Sîsin, ?–291/292), also known as Sisinnius (Latin: Sisinnius), was one of the twelve Apostles of Mani, the founder of Manichaeism. He was one of the most influential Manichaeans in the early church, as he served as a core figure of the early church and was the first Manichaean Archegos, the head of the Manichaean religion.

== Mission ==
Mar Sisin was one of the twelve apostles chosen by Mani himself. When Mani was alive, he had a high status within Manichaeism. When Mani left Babylon, he was responsible for the internal work of the church. He went to the Roman Empire and preached in Central Asia. Around 261-262, Mar Sisin went to Mary to inspect and was very satisfied with the missionary situation there. He sent someone to bring two holy books and to see Mar Ammo who was preaching in Zamb. He copied these books in Mulu.

== Leading the Church ==
In 273, Mar Ammo went to visit Mani in prison, and Mani delivered the "last letter" to Mar Ammo, explaining the affairs of the church. In 274, Mani was executed by Bahram I. In 276, Mar Sisin was appointed the first Archegos of the Manichean Babylonian Church. It is also said that Mar Sisin only became the Archegos five years after Mani's death. Mar Sisin served as the Archegos for ten years. Leading the Manichaeans to adhere to their beliefs, making Ctesiphon the place where the Manichaean holy seat resides in Tin, and is unanimously recognized by all Manichaeans around the world. In 286, Bahram II began a new wave of persecution of Manichaeans, Mar Sisin was martyred in this persecution. In the Dunhuang manuscript "Chinese Manichaean hymn scroll", he left his absolute letter "Sigh of impermanence" to warn the faithful We should not be greedy for the material comforts of the world, and be obsessed with the physical body for the dark demon delusion. We should practice diligently before death, and ascend to Heaven after death so that we can liberate ourselves and achieve enlightenment.

== Remembrance ==
After Mar Sisin's death, Innaios, one of the Twelve Apostles, succeeded him as the Archegos. Thanks to the diplomatic efforts of Innaios, the persecution of Manichaeism has temporarily come to an end. In order to commemorate the sacrifice of Mosshin, the Manichaeism held a two-day Fasting becomes one of the five times "double-day Fasts" every year.

== See also ==
- Manichaeism
- Mani
- Mar Ammo
