= Abu Hilal al-Dayhuri =

Manichaean leader

Abū Hilāl al-Dayhūri was a Manichaean leader. Of North African origin, he served as archegos, the traditional leader of the Manichaean sect seated in Seleucia-Ctesiphon some time during the mid-to-late eighth century.

== Origins ==
Al-Dayhūri hailed from North Africa, once a major center of Manichaean activity. He then travelled to present-day Iraq. It is unknown, however, whether he converted to Manichaeism after his arrival there or had originally been a Manichaean in Africa. As such, it is difficult to use him to gauge the health of Manichaeism in eighth-century North Africa. He may have been a Berber.

== Significance ==
During the reign (754–775) of the second Abbasid caliph, Al-Mansur, al-Dayhūri attained the status of archegos, "the traditional seat of the supreme head of the Manichaean church" in Seleucia-Ctesiphon.

He is most important for temporarily resolving a major rift in the sect between the followers of two previous archegos, those of the orthodox-minded Miqlās (the "Miqlāsiyya") and those of the more compromising Mihr (the "Mihriyya").
