= Manichaeism =

Persian religion founded in the 3rd century AD

- آئینِ مانی 摩尼教
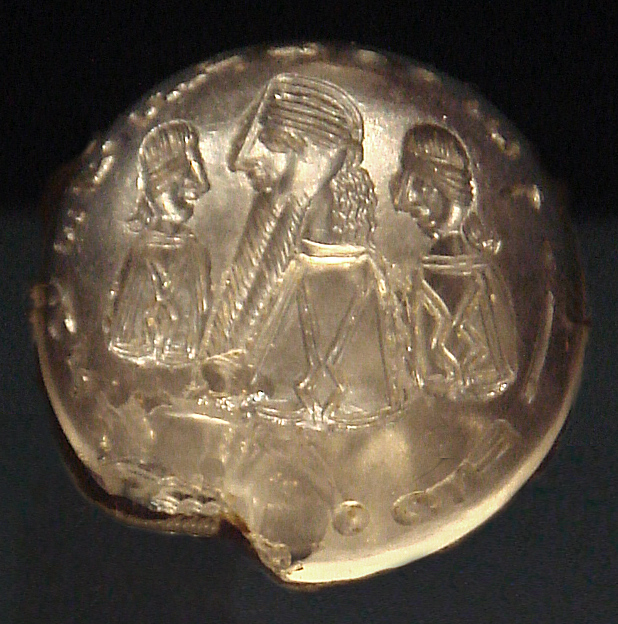
- Sealstone of Mani, carved quartz crystal, possibly 3rd century AD, Iraq. Cabinet des Médailles, Paris. The seal reads "Mani, messenger of the messiah", and may have been used by Mani himself to sign his letters.
- Type: Universal religion
- Classification: Iranian religion
- Scripture: Manichaean scripture
- Theology: Dualistic
- Region: Historical: Europe, East Asia, Central Asia, West Asia, North Africa, Siberia
- Language: Middle Persian, Classical Syriac, Parthian, Classical Latin, Classical Chinese, Old Uyghur language, Tocharian B, Sogdian language, Greek
- Founder: Mani
- Origin: 3rd century AD; Parthian Empire, Sasanian Empire
- Separated from: Elcesaite sect, and the teachings of Jesus, Shakyamuni Buddha, and Zoroaster
- Separations: Manichaean schisms: Chinese Manichaeism

A portrait of a Persian Manichaean. Line drawing copy of two frescoes from cave 38B at Bezeklik Grottoes.

An image of a Manichaean temple with stars and seven firmaments. Line drawing copy of two frescoes from cave 38B at Bezeklik Grottoes.

Manichaeism (Note: Also spelled Manichaism /ˌmænɪˈkeɪɪzəm/ in accordance with the Koine Greek Μανιχαϊσμός Manikhaïsmós and its regular Latinization Manichaismus.) (/ˌmænɪˈkiː.ɪzəm/; Persian: آئین مانی, romanized: Āʾīn-i Mānī; Chinese: 摩尼教; pinyin: Móníjiào) was a major world religion founded in the third century AD by the Parthian Iranian prophet Mani (216–274) in the Sasanian Empire. It taught an elaborate dualistic cosmology describing the struggle between a good spiritual world of light, and an evil material world of darkness. Through an ongoing process in human history, light is gradually removed from the world of matter and returned to the world of the divine.

Mani's teachings were intended to integrate, succeed, and surpass the "partial truths" of various prior faiths and belief systems, including Ancient Babylonian and other Mesopotamian traditions, Ancient Greek traditions, Greco-Roman mystery traditions, Platonism, Iranian and Zoroastrian traditions, Brahmanism, Sramanic traditions including Jainism and Buddhism, both Hellenistic and Rabbinic Jewish traditions, and Christian traditions including Marcionite, Bardaisanite, and Elkesaite. Most forms of Manichaeism viewed Mani as the final prophet sent after succession of various prophets most prominently Zoroaster, The Buddha, and Jesus, each of whose teachings were later corrupted and distorted by people like Devadatta and Judas Iscariot. The canon of Manichaean scripture included seven works originally written in Syriac and attributed to Mani, who was said to have illustrated a canonical book of pictures. Manichaean sacramental rites included prayers, almsgiving, fasting, and most centrally the daily ritual meal of the elect. Communal life centered on confession and the singing of hymns.

With its message of universal salvation and emphasis on active proselytism, Manichaeism was quickly successful and spread throughout Aramaic-speaking regions, the Mediterranean, and the Middle East. It thrived between the third and seventh centuries AD, and at its height was one of the most widespread religions in the world. Manichaean churches and scriptures existed as far east as China and as far west as Roman Iberia. Before the spread of Islam, Manichaeanism was briefly the main rival to early Christianity. It was increasingly persecuted both by the Roman state and the nascent Christian church, largely disappearing from Roman lands by the end of the sixth century.

Manichaeism survived and expanded in the East. It maintained its historic presence in West Asia until being repressed by the latter Abbasid Caliphate rulers in the 10th century. Trade and missionary activity brought Manichaeism to Tang China in the seventh century, where it developed into its own local form. Manichaeism was the official religion of the Uyghur Khaganate until its collapse in 840; shortly thereafter, it was banned by the Tang court but experienced a resurgence under the later Mongol Yuan dynasty during the 13th and 14th centuries. Continued persecution by Chinese emperors led to Manichaeism becoming subsumed into Buddhism and Taoism before the end of the 14th century.

Some historic Manichaean sites still exist in China, including the temple of Cao'an in Jinjiang, Fujian, and the religion may have influenced later movements in the European Middle Ages, including Paulicianism, Bogomilism, and Catharism. While most original Manichean writings have been lost, numerous translations and fragmentary texts have survived.

== Terminology ==
The spelling Manichaeism is a hypercorrection of Manichaism, which derives from Koine Greek Μανιχαϊσμός(Manikhaïsmós) via Latin Manichaismus. The Greek word is built on Μανιχαῖος (Manikhaîos; 'Manichaeus'), one of the names of Mani in Greek sources.

In English, an adherent of Manichaeism is called a Manichaean, Manichean, or Manichee.

== History ==
=== Life of Mani ===
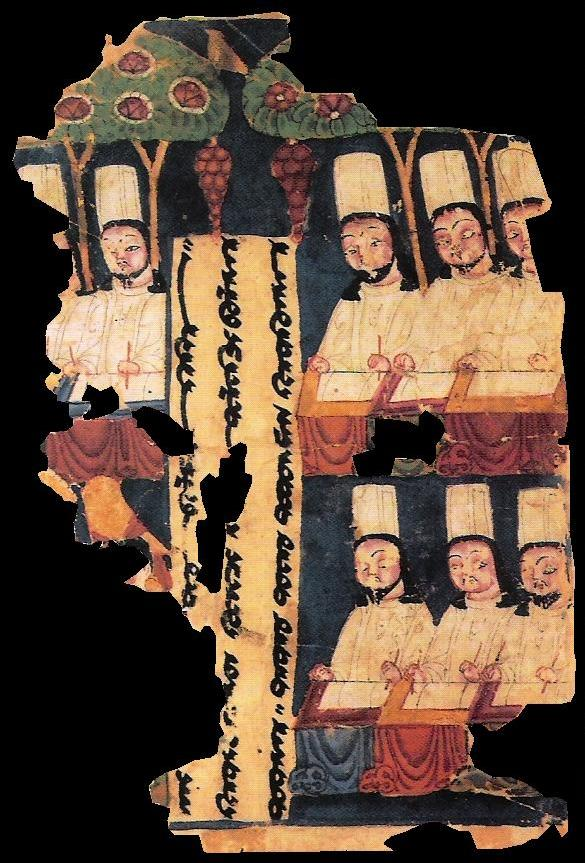
Manichaean priests, writing at their desks. Eighth or ninth century manuscript from Gaochang, Tarim Basin, China.

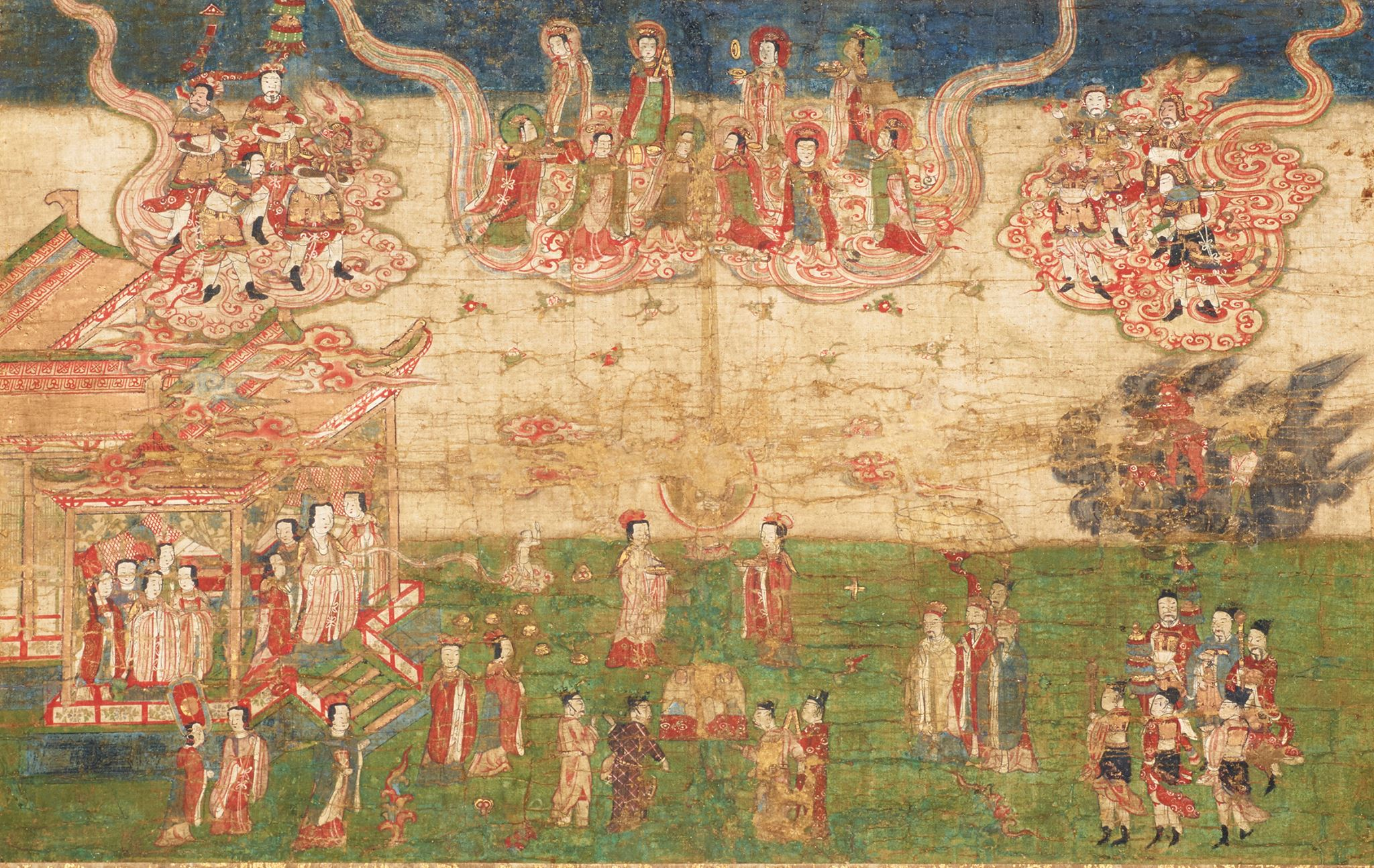
Yuan Chinese silk painting Mani's Birth

Mani was an Iranian (Note: "According to the Fehrest, Mani was of Arsacid stock on both his father's and his mother's sides, at least if the readings al-ḥaskāniya (Mani's father) and al-asʿāniya (Mani's mother) are corrected to al-aškāniya and al-ašḡāniya (ed. Flügel, 1862, p. 49, ll. 2 and 3) respectively. The forefathers of Mani's father are said to have been from Hamadan and so perhaps of Iranian origin (ed. Flügel, 1862, p. 49, 5–6). The Chinese Compendium, which makes the father a local king, maintains that his mother was from the house Jinsajian, explained by Henning as the Armenian Arsacid family of Kamsarakan (Henning, 1943, p. 52, n. 4 1977, II, p. 115). Is that fact, or fiction, or both? The historicity of this tradition is assumed by most, but the possibility that Mani's noble Arsacid background is legendary cannot be ruled out (cf. Scheftelowitz, 1933, pp. 403–4). In any case, it is characteristic that Mani took pride in his origin from time-honored Babel, but never claimed affiliation to the Iranian upper class." – "Manichaeism" at Encyclopædia Iranica) born in 216 CE in or near Ctesiphon (now al-Mada'in, Iraq) in the Parthian Empire. According to the Cologne Mani-Codex, Mani's parents were members of the Jewish Christian Gnostic sect known as the Elcesaites.

Mani composed seven works, six of which were written in the late-Aramaic Syriac language. The seventh, the Shabuhragan, was written by Mani in Middle Persian and presented to the Sasanian emperor Shapur I by Mani himself. Although there is no evidence that Shapur I was a follower of Mani, he tolerated the spread of Manichaeism and refrained from persecuting it within his empire's boundaries.

According to Michel Tardieu, Mani invented the unique version of the Syriac script known as the Manichaean alphabet, which was used in all Manichaean works written within the Sasanian Empire, whether in Syriac or Middle Persian, as well as in most works written within the Uyghur Khaganate. The primary language of Babylonia—and the administrative and cultural language of the Empire—at that time was Eastern Middle Aramaic, which had three principle dialects: Jewish Babylonian Aramaic, the language of the Babylonian Talmud; Mandaic, the language of Mandaeism; and Syriac, which was the language of Mani and the Syriac Christians.

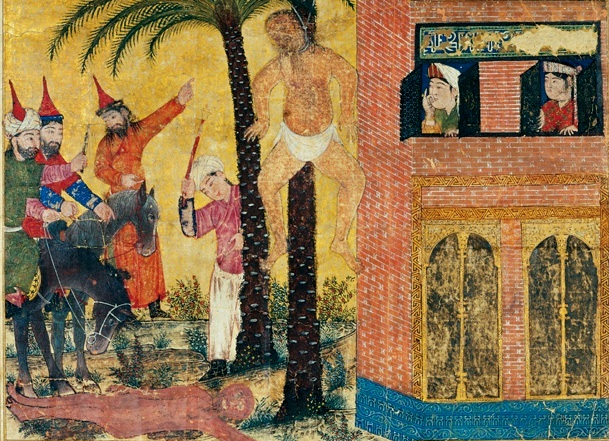
A 14th-century illustration of the execution of Mani

During the spread of Manichaeism, established religions like Zoroastrianism remained prevalent, while early Christianity was gaining both social and political influence. Despite having fewer followers, Manichaeism attracted the support of several high-ranking political figures. With the backing of the Sasanian Empire, Mani embarked on missionary expeditions. However, after failing to gain the favor of the next generation of Persian royalty and facing disapproval from the Zoroastrian clergy, Mani was imprisoned and ultimately died awaiting execution by the Persian emperor Bahram I. His death is estimated to have occurred around 276–277 CE.

=== Influences ===
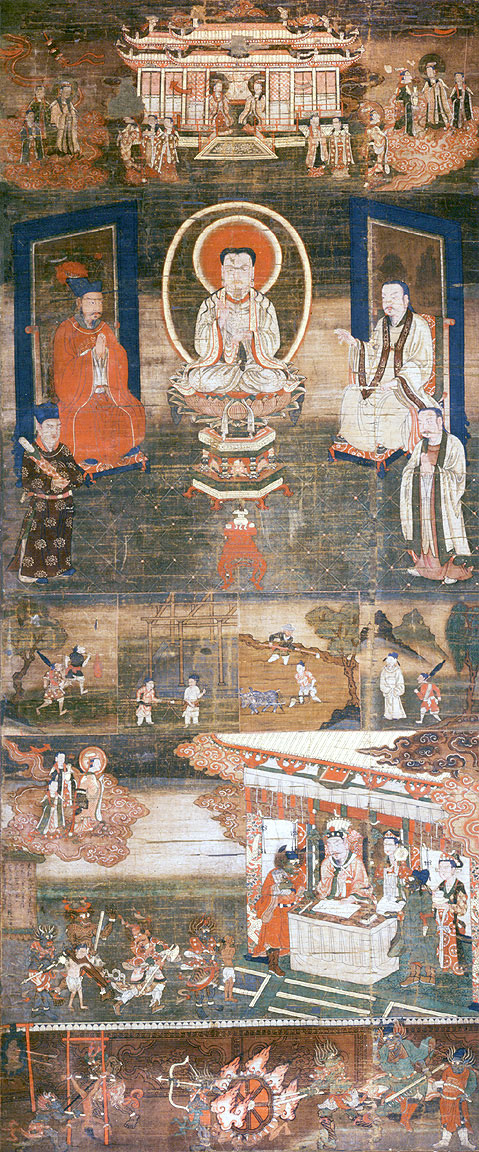
Sermon on Mani's Teaching of Salvation, 13th-century Chinese Manichaean silk painting

Mani believed that the teachings of the Buddha, Zoroaster, and Jesus of Nazareth were incomplete; that his revelations were meant to be shared universally; and that his teachings comprised a new "religion of light". Manichaean writings indicate that Mani received revelations when he was 12 and again at 24, and that over this period he grew dissatisfied with the Elcesaites, the Gnostic sect of Jewish Christianity he was born into. Iain Gardner, in The Founder of Manichaeism, argues that Jain influence on Mani is likely due to the extreme asceticism and specific doctrines of Mahāvīra's community, making it even more plausible than influence from the Buddha. Richard C. C. Fynes, in 1996, argued that various Jain influences, particularly ideas on the existence of plant souls, were transmitted from Western Kshatrapa territories to Mesopotamia and then integrated into Manichaean beliefs. Mani wore colorful clothing, which was unusual for the time, and reminded some Romans of a stereotypical Persian magus or warlord, earning him ire in the Greco-Roman world.

Mani began preaching at an early age and was possibly influenced by contemporary Babylonian-Aramaic movements like Mandaeism; Aramaic translations of non-canonical Jewish apocalyptic works similar to those found at Qumran (e.g., the Book of Enoch); and by the Syriac dualist Gnostic writer Bardaisan (who lived a generation before Mani). With the discovery of the Cologne Mani-Codex, it also became clear that his history with the Elcesaites influenced his writings.

Mani taught that the soul of a righteous individual returns to Paradise upon death. In contrast, the soul of someone who indulges in earthly desires—such as fornication, procreation, accumulating possessions, cultivating the land, harvesting, eating meat, and drinking wine—faces condemnation and is destined to be reborn in a cycle of different bodies.

According to biographies preserved by ibn al-Nadim and the Persian polymath al-Biruni, Mani received a revelation as a youth from a spirit, whom he would later call his "Twin" (Imperial Aramaic: תְּאוֹמָא, romanized: Tāʾūmā; pronounced [tɑʔwmɑ]); Syzygos (Koine Greek: σύζυγος, lit. 'together-yoked'), in the Cologne Mani-Codex; "Double"; "Protective Angel"; or "Divine Self". This spirit taught him wisdom, which he later developed into a religion. It was his "twin" who brought Mani to self-realization. Mani claimed to be the Paraclete of the Truth promised by Jesus in the book of John 14:16 of the New Testament.

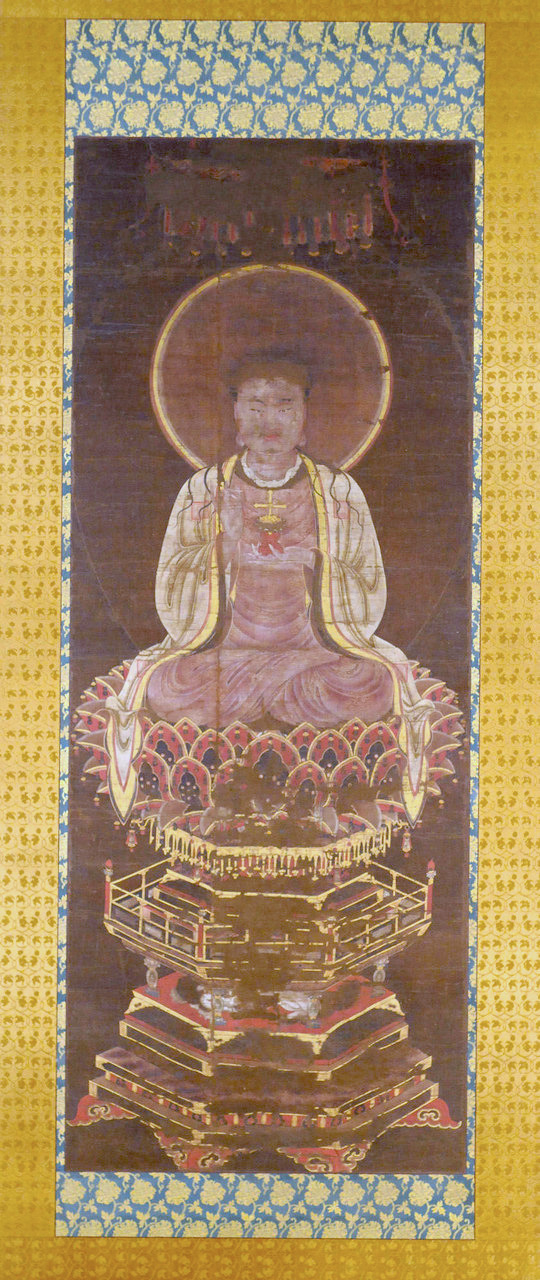
Manichaean Painting of the Buddha Jesus depicts Jesus as a Manichaean prophet.

According to the scholar of Manichaeism Samuel N. C. Lieu, the theological roles of Jesus in Manichaeism were highly complex:

Jesus in Manichaeism possessed three separate identities:

1. Jesus the Luminous,
2. Jesus the Messiah and
3. Jesus patibilis (the suffering Jesus).

1. As Jesus the Luminous ... his primary role was as supreme revealer and guide and it was he who woke Adam from his slumber and revealed to him the divine origins of his soul and its painful captivity by the body and mixture with matter.

2. Jesus the Messiah was an historical being who was the prophet of the Jews and the forerunner of Mani. However, the Manichaeans believed he was wholly divine, and that he never experienced human birth, as the physical realities surrounding the notions of his conception and his birth filled the Manichaeans with horror. However, the Christian doctrine of virgin birth was also regarded as obscene. Since Jesus the Messiah was the light of the world, where was this light, they reasoned, when Jesus was in the womb of the Virgin? Jesus the Messiah, they believed, was truly born only at his baptism, as it was on that occasion that the Father openly acknowledged his sonship. The suffering, death and resurrection of this Jesus were in appearance only as they had no salvific value but were an exemplum of the suffering and eventual deliverance of the human soul and a prefiguration of Mani's own martyrdom.

3. The pain suffered by the imprisoned Light-Particles [sic?] in the whole of the visible universe, on the other hand, was real and immanent. This was symbolized by the mystic placing of the Cross whereby the wounds of the passion of our souls are set forth. On this mystical Cross of Light was suspended the Suffering Jesus (Jesus patibilis) who was the life and salvation of Man. This mystica crucifixio was present in every tree, herb, fruit, vegetable, and even stones and the soil. This constant and universal suffering of the captive soul is exquisitely expressed in one of the Coptic Manichaean psalms.

Augustine of Hippo also noted that Mani declared himself to be an "apostle of Jesus Christ". Manichaean tradition is noted to have claimed that Mani was the reincarnation of religious figures from previous eras, including the Buddha, Zoroaster, and Jesus himself.

Academics note that much of what is known about Manichaeism comes from later 10th- and 11th-century Muslim historians like al-Biruni and ibn al-Nadim in his al-Fihrist; the latter "ascribed to Mani the claim to be the Seal of the Prophets." However, given the Islamic milieu of Arabian Peninsula and Persia at the time, it stands to reason that Manichaeans would regularly assert in their evangelism that Mani, not Muhammad, was the Seal of the Prophets. In reality, for Mani, the metaphorical expression "Seal of Prophets" was not a reference to his finality in a lineage of prophets as it means in Islam, but rather as final to his followers (who attest to his message as a "seal").

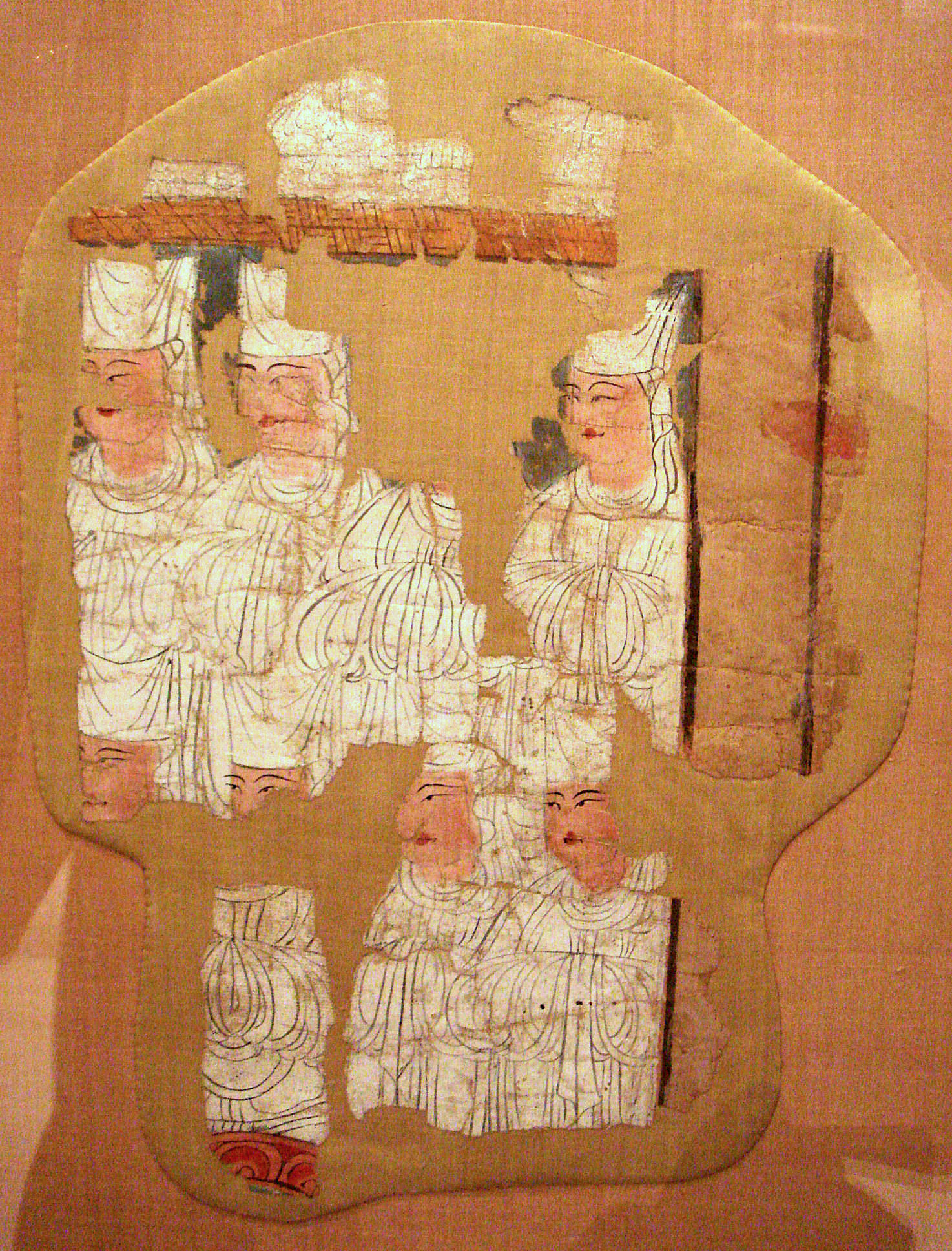
10th century Manichaean Electae in Gaochang (Khocho), China

Other textual sources of Mani's scripture were the Aramaic Jewish Book of Enoch, 2 Enoch, and The Book of Giants. Mani quoted the latter directly and expanded upon it, making it—a specifically Manichaean version—one of the six original Syriac writings of the Manichaeans. Besides short references by non-Manichaean authors through the centuries, no original editions of the Manichaean Book of Giants were available until the 20th century.

Scattered fragments of both the original Aramaic Book of Giants, which was analyzed and published by Józef Milik in 1976, and the Manichaean version of the same name (analyzed and published by Walter Bruno Henning in 1943) were discovered along with the Dead Sea Scrolls in the Judaean Desert in the 20th century and the Manichaean writings of the Uyghur Manichaean kingdom in Turpan. Henning wrote in his analysis of them:

It is noteworthy that Mani, who was brought up and spent most of his life in a province of the Persian empire, and whose mother belonged to a famous Parthian family, did not make any use of the Iranian mythological tradition. There can no longer be any doubt that the Iranian names of Sām, Narīmān, etc., that appear in the Persian and Sogdian versions of the Book of the Giants, did not figure in the original edition, written by Mani in the Syriac language.

By comparing the cosmology of the books of Enoch to the Book of Giants, as well as the description of the Manichaean myth, scholars have observed that the Manichaean cosmology can be described as being based, in part, on the description of the cosmology developed in detail within the Enochic literature. This literature describes the being who the prophets saw in their ascent to Heaven as a king who sits on a throne in the highest of the heavens. In Manichaean myth, this being, the "Great King of Honor", became a deity who guards the entrance to the World of Light, placed at the seventh of ten heavens. In the Aramaic Book of Enoch, the Qumran writings, overall, and in the original Syriac section of Manichaean scriptures quoted by Theodore bar Konai, he is called malkā rabbā d-iqārā ("the Great King of Honor").

Mani was also influenced by writings of the gnostic Bardaisan (154–222 CE), who, like Mani, wrote in Syriac and presented a dualistic interpretation of the world in terms of light and darkness in combination with elements from Christianity.

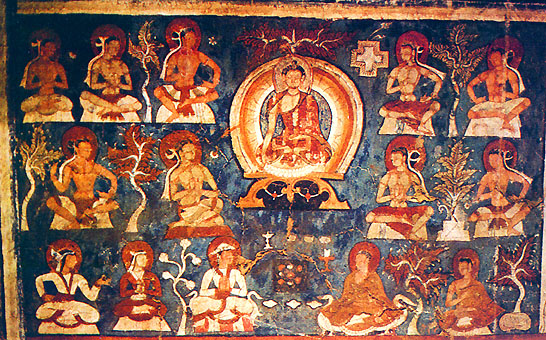
Akshobhya in the abhirati with the Cross of Light, a symbol of Manichaeism

Noting Mani's travels to the Kushan Empire (several religious paintings in Bamyan are attributed to him) at the beginning of his proselytizing career, Richard Foltz postulates Buddhist influences in Manichaeism:

Buddhist influences were significant in the formation of Mani's religious thought. The transmigration of souls became a Manichaean belief, and the quadripartite structure of the Manichaean community, divided between male and female monks (the "elect") and lay followers (the "hearers") who supported them, appears to be based on that of the Buddhist sangha.

Lokakṣema, a Buddhist monk living in second-century Kushan, began translating the scriptures of Pure Land Buddhism into Chinese during the century preceding Mani's advent. Extant Chinese Manichaean texts frequently employ uniquely Buddhist terms taken from the Pure Land scriptures, including the term "pure land" (Chinese: 淨土; pinyin: jìngtǔ) itself, argued Peter Bryder. However, the central object of veneration in Pure Land Buddhism, Amitābha, the "Buddha of Infinite Light", does not appear in Chinese Manichaeism and seems to have been replaced by another deity.

=== Spread ===
==== Roman Empire ====
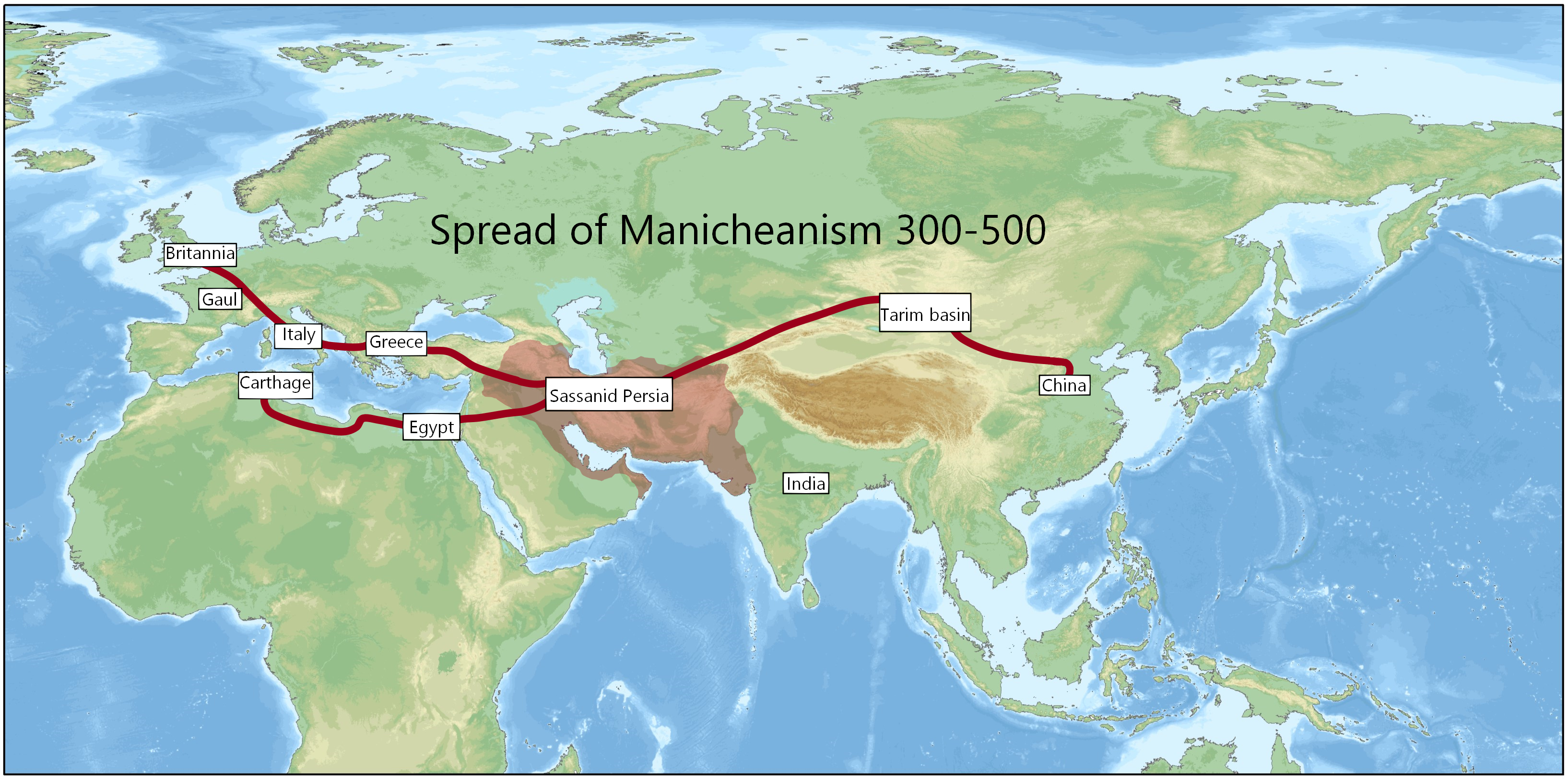
A map of the spread of Manichaeism (300–500). World History Atlas, DK.

Manichaeism reached Rome through the apostle Psattiq in 280, who had been in Egypt in 244 and 251. The religion was flourishing in the Faiyum in 290. Manichaean monasteries existed in Rome in 312 during the reign of emperor Constantine and tenure of Pope Miltiades.

In 291, persecution arose in the Sasanian Empire with the murder of the apostle Mar Sisin orchestrated by Emperor Bahram II and the slaughter of many Manichaeans. In 302, the first official Roman state reaction and legislation against Manichaeism was issued under Diocletian. In an official edict entitled De Maleficiis et Manichaeis, compiled in the Collatio Legum Mosaicarum et Romanarum, and addressed to the proconsul of Africa, Diocletian wrote:

We have heard that the Manichaeans [...] have set up new and hitherto unheard-of sects in opposition to the older creeds so that they might cast out the doctrines vouchsafed to us in the past by the divine favour for the benefit of their own depraved doctrine. They have sprung forth very recently like new and unexpected monstrosities among the race of the Persians – a nation still hostile to us – and have made their way into our empire, where they are committing many outrages, disturbing the tranquility of our people and even inflicting grave damage to the civic communities. We have cause to fear that with the passage of time they will endeavour, as usually happens, to infect the modest and tranquil of an innocent nature with the damnable customs and perverse laws of the Persians as with the poison of a malignant (serpent) ... We order that the authors and leaders of these sects be subjected to severe punishment, and, together with their abominable writings, burnt in the flames. We direct their followers, if they continue recalcitrant, shall suffer capital punishment, and their goods be forfeited to the imperial treasury. And if those who have gone over to that hitherto unheard-of, scandalous and wholly infamous creed, or to that of the Persians, are persons who hold public office, or are of any rank or of superior social status, you will see to it that their estates are confiscated and the offenders sent to the (quarry) at Phaeno or the mines at Proconnesus. And in order that this plague of iniquity shall be completely extirpated from this our most happy age, let your devotion hasten to carry out our orders and commands.

By 354, Hilary of Poitiers wrote that Manichaeism was a significant force in Roman Gaul. In 381, Christians requested that Theodosius I strip Manichaeans of their civil rights. Starting in 382, the emperor issued a series of edicts to suppress Manichaeism and punish its followers.

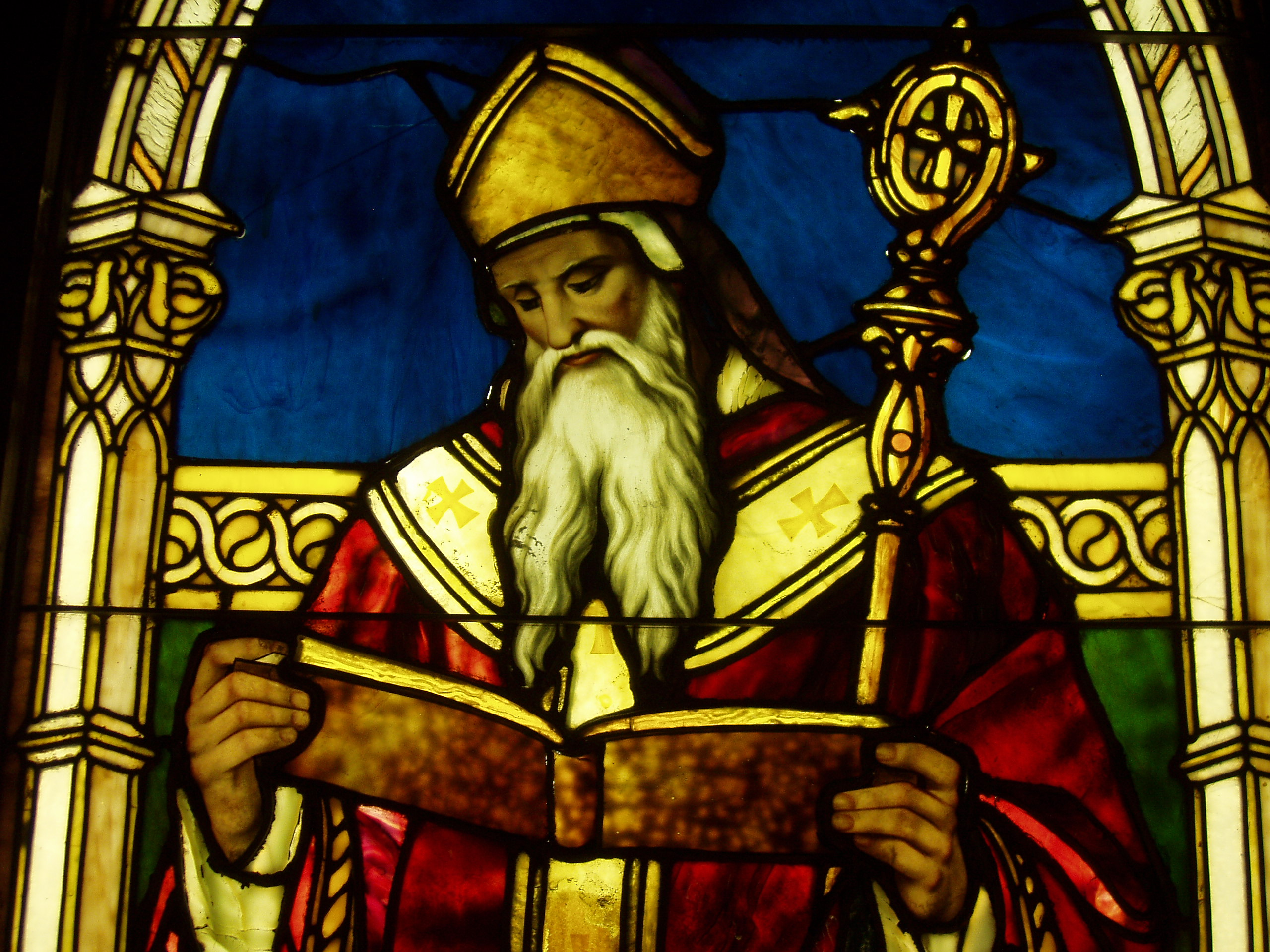
Augustine of Hippo was Manichaean as a young adult.

Augustine of Hippo (354–430) converted to Christianity from Manichaeism in the year 387. The Roman emperor Theodosius I had issued a decree ordering the execution of all Manichaean monks in 382, and would establish Christianity as the Roman state religion in 391. Due to Roman persecution, Manichaeism nearly disappeared from Western Europe in the fifth century and from the eastern portion of the empire in the sixth century.

According to his Confessions, after nine or ten years of adhering to the Manichaean faith as a member of the group of "hearers", Augustine of Hippo became a Christian and potent adversary of Manichaeism (which he expressed in writing against his Manichaean opponent Faustus of Mileve), seeing adherents' belief that knowledge (i.e., gnosis) was salvific as too passive and unable to effect change in one's life.

I still thought that it is not we who sin but some other nature that sins within us. It flattered my pride to think that I incurred no guilt and, when I did wrong, not to confess it ... I preferred to excuse myself and blame this unknown thing which was in me but was not part of me. The truth, of course, was that it was all my own self, and my own impiety had divided me against myself. My sin was all the more incurable because I did not think myself a sinner.

Some modern scholars have suggested that Manichaean ways of thinking influenced the development of some of Augustine's ideas, such as the nature of good and evil; the concept of hell; the separation of groups into 'elect', 'hearers', and 'sinners'; hostility toward human experience and sexual activity; and his dualistic theology.

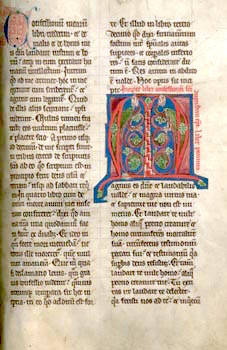
A 13th-century manuscript from Augustine's book VII of Confessions criticizing Manichaeism

==== Central Asia ====
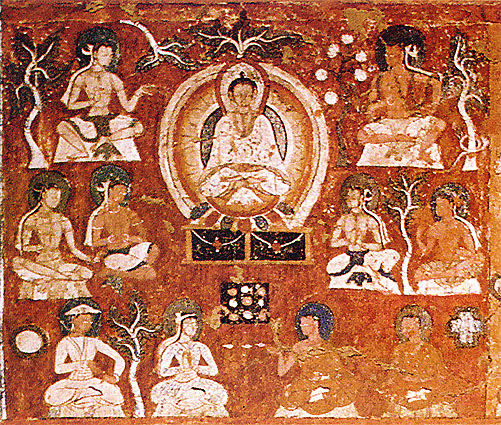
Amitābha in his Western Paradise with Indians, Tibetans, and Central Asians, with two symbols of Manichaeism: Sun and Cross

Adherents existed in Sogdia in Central Asia. Uyghur khagan Bögü Qaghan (759–780) converted to the religion in 763 after a three-day discussion with preachers. The Babylonian headquarters sent high-ranking clerics to the Uyghurs, and Manichaeism remained the state religion for about a century before the disestablishment of the Uyghur Khaganate in 840.

==== South Siberia ====
After the defeat of the Uyghur Khaganate by the Yenisei Kyrgyz, Manichaeism spread north to the Minusinsk Hollow. Archaeological excavations in the Uybat valley revealed ruins of a Manichaean center there, which included six temples and five sanctuaries of the elements; architecturally, it was similar to the Sogdian structures in Tuva and Xinjiang. In the 1970s, a Manichaean temple dating to the 8th to 10th centuries was excavated 90 km from the Uybat center in the Puyur-sukh valley. L.R Kyzlasov interpreted the finds as evidence of the adoption of Manichaeism as an official religion in the Kyrgyz Khaganate. Few Khakassian Manichaean epitaphs confirm this version; the Manichaean script also influenced the Yenisei runic script at a late stage of its development. South Siberian Manichaeism existed before the Mongol conquest. Later, it influenced the formation of the culture of the Sayano-Altai Turks (Altaians, Khakas, Tuvans), as well as the Khants, Selkups, Kets and Evenks. This influence affected the everyday beliefs of the indigenous peoples and the lexical composition of their languages.

==== China ====
In the East, it spread along trade routes as far as Chang'an, the capital of Tang China.

After the Tang dynasty, some Manichaean groups participated in peasant movements. Many rebel leaders used religion to mobilize followers. In Song and Yuan dynasty China, remnants of Manichaeism continued to leave a legacy, contributing to sects such as the Red Turbans. During the Song dynasty, the Manichaeans were derogatorily referred by the Chinese as Chīcài shìmó (Chinese: 吃菜事魔, meaning that they "abstain from meat and worship demons").

An account in Fozu Tongji, an important historiography of Buddhism in China compiled by Buddhist scholars during 1258–1269, states that the Manichaeans worshipped the "White Buddha" and that their leader wore a violet headgear, while their followers wore white costumes. Many Manichaeans participated in rebellions against the Song government, which were eventually quelled. After that, all governments suppressed Manichaeism and its followers, and the religion was banned in Ming China in 1370. While it had long been thought that Manichaeism arrived in China only at the end of the seventh century, a recent archaeological discovery demonstrated that it was already known there in the second half of the 6th century.

The nomadic Uyghur Khaganate lasted for less than a century (744–840) in the southern Siberian steppe, with the fortified city of Ordu-Baliq on the Upper Orkhon River as its capital. Before the end of the year (763), Manichaeism was declared the official religion of the Uyghur state. Boku Tekin banned all shamanistic rituals previously in use. His subjects likely accepted his decision. That much results from a report that the proclamation of Manichaeism as the state religion was met with enthusiasm in Ordu-Baliq. In an inscription in which the Kaghan speaks for himself, he promised the Manichaean high priests (the "Elect") that if they gave orders, he would promptly follow them and respond to their requests. An incomplete manuscript found in the Turfan Oasis gives Boku Tekin the title of zahag-i Mani ("Emanation of Mani" or "Descendant of Mani"), a title of majestic prestige among the Manichaeans of Central Asia.

Nonetheless, despite the apparently willing conversion of the Uyghurs to Manichaeism, traces of previous shamanistic practices persisted. For instance, in 765, only two years after the official conversion, during a military campaign in China, Uyghur troops called upon magicians to perform several specific rituals. Manichaean Uyghurs continued to treat with great respect a sacred forest in Otuken. The conversion to Manichaeism led to an explosion of manuscript production in the Tarim Basin and Gansu (the region between the Tibetan and the Huangtu plateaus), which lasted well into the early 11th century. In 840, the Uyghur Khaganate collapsed under the attacks of the Yenisei Kyrgyz, and the new Uyghur state of Qocho was established with a capital in the city of Qocho.

Al-Jahiz (776–868 or 869) believed that the peaceful lifestyle that Manicheism brought to the Uyghurs was responsible for their later lack of military skills and eventual decline. This, however, is contradicted by the political and military consequences of the conversion. After the Uyghurs migrated to Turfan in the ninth century, the nobility maintained Manichaean beliefs for a time before converting to Buddhism. Traces of Manicheism among the Uyghurs in Turfan may be detected in fragments of Uyghur Manichaean manuscripts. In fact, Manichaeism continued to rival Buddhism in influence among the Uyghurs until the 13th century. The Mongols gave the final blow to Manichaeism among the Uyghurs.

==== Tibet ====
Manichaeism spread to Tibet during the Tibetan Empire. There was a serious attempt made to introduce the religion to the Tibetans, as the text Criteria of the Authentic Scriptures (a text attributed to the Tibetan Emperor Trisong Detsen) makes a great effort to attack Manichaeism by stating that Mani was a heretic who engaged in religious syncretism into a deviating and inauthentic form.

==== Iran ====
Manichaeans in Iran tried to assimilate their religion along with Islam in the Muslim caliphates. Relatively little is known about the religion during the first century of Islamic rule. During the early caliphates, Manichaeism attracted many followers. It had a significant appeal among Muslim society, especially among the elites. A part of Manichaeism that specifically appealed to the Sasanians was the names of the Manichaean gods. The names Mani assigned to the gods of his religion show identification with those of the Zoroastrian pantheon, even though some of the divine beings he incorporated are non-Iranian. For example, Jesus, Adam, and Eve were named Xradesahr, Gehmurd, and Murdiyanag. Because of these familiar names, Manichaeism did not feel completely foreign to the Zoroastrians. Due to the appeal of its teachings, many Sasanians adopted the ideas of its theology and some even became dualists.

Not only were the citizens of the Sasanian Empire intrigued by Manichaeism, but so was the ruler at the time of its introduction, Shapur I. As the Denkard reports, Shapur, the first King of Kings, was very well known for gaining and seeking knowledge of any kind. Because of this, Mani knew that Shapur would lend an ear to his teachings and accept him. Mani had explicitly stated while introducing his teachings to Shapur, that his religion should be seen as a reform of Zoroaster's teachings. This was of great fascination to the king, for it perfectly fit Shapur's dream of creating a large empire that incorporated all people and their different creeds. Thus, Manichaeism became widespread and flourished throughout the Sasanian Empire for thirty years. An apologia for Manichaeism ascribed to ibn al-Muqaffa' defended its phantasmagorical cosmogony and attacked the fideism of Islam and other monotheistic religions. The Manichaeans had sufficient structure to have a head of their community.

Tolerance toward Manichaeism decreased after the death of Shapur I. His son, Hormizd I, who became king, still allowed for Manichaeism in the empire, but he also greatly trusted the Zoroastrian priest, Kartir. After Hormizd's short reign, his oldest brother, Bahram I, became king. Bahram I held Kartir in high esteem, and he also had many religious ideals different from those of Hormizd and his father, Shapur I. Due to Kartir's influence, Zoroastrianism was strengthened throughout the empire, which in turn diminished Manichaeism. Bahram sentenced Mani to prison, and he died there.

==== Arab world ====
That Manicheism went further on to the Arabian Peninsula, up to the Hejaz and Mecca, where it could have possibly contributed to the formation of the doctrine of Islam, cannot be proven in pre-Islamic Arabia, and there was no formal existence of Manichaeism in the Hejaz. Under the eighth-century Abbasid Caliphate, Arabic zindīq and the adjectival term zandaqa could denote many different things, but it seems to have primarily—or at least initially—signified a follower of Manichaeism. From the ninth century, it is reported that Caliph al-Ma'mun tolerated a community of Manichaeans.

During the early Abbasid period, the Manichaeans underwent persecution. The third Abbasid caliph, al-Mahdi, persecuted the Manichaeans, establishing an inquisition against dualists who, if found guilty of heresy, refused to renounce their beliefs and were executed. Their persecution was ended in the 780s by Harun al-Rashid. During the reign of the caliph al-Muqtadir, many Manichaeans fled from Mesopotamia to Khorasan in fear of persecution, and the base of the religion was later shifted to Samarkand.

==== Bactria ====
The first appearance of Manichaeism in Bactria was during Mani's lifetime. While he never physically traveled there, he did send a disciple by the name of Mar Ammo to spread his gospel. Mani "called (upon) Mar Ammo, the teacher, who knew the Parthian language and script, and was well acquainted with lords and ladies and with many nobles in those places..."

Mar Ammo traveled to the previous Parthian lands of eastern Iran, which bordered Bactria. A translation of Persian texts states the following from the perspective of Mar Ammo: "They had arrived at the watch post of Kushān (Bactria), then the spirit of the border of the eastern province appeared in the shape of a girl, and he (the spirit) asked me, 'Ammo, what do you intend? From where have you come?' I said, 'I am a believer, a disciple of Mani, the Apostle.' That spirit said, 'I do not receive you. Return from where you have come.'"

Despite the initial rejection Mar Ammo faced, the text records that Mani's spirit appeared to Mar Ammo and asked him to persevere and read the chapter "The Collecting of the Gates" from The Treasure of the Living. Once he did so, the spirit returned, transformed, and said, "I am Bag Ard, the frontier guard of the Eastern Province. When I receive you, then the gate of the whole East will be opened in front of you." It seemed that this "border spirit" was a reference to the local Eastern Iranian goddess Ardoksho, who was prevalent in Bactria.

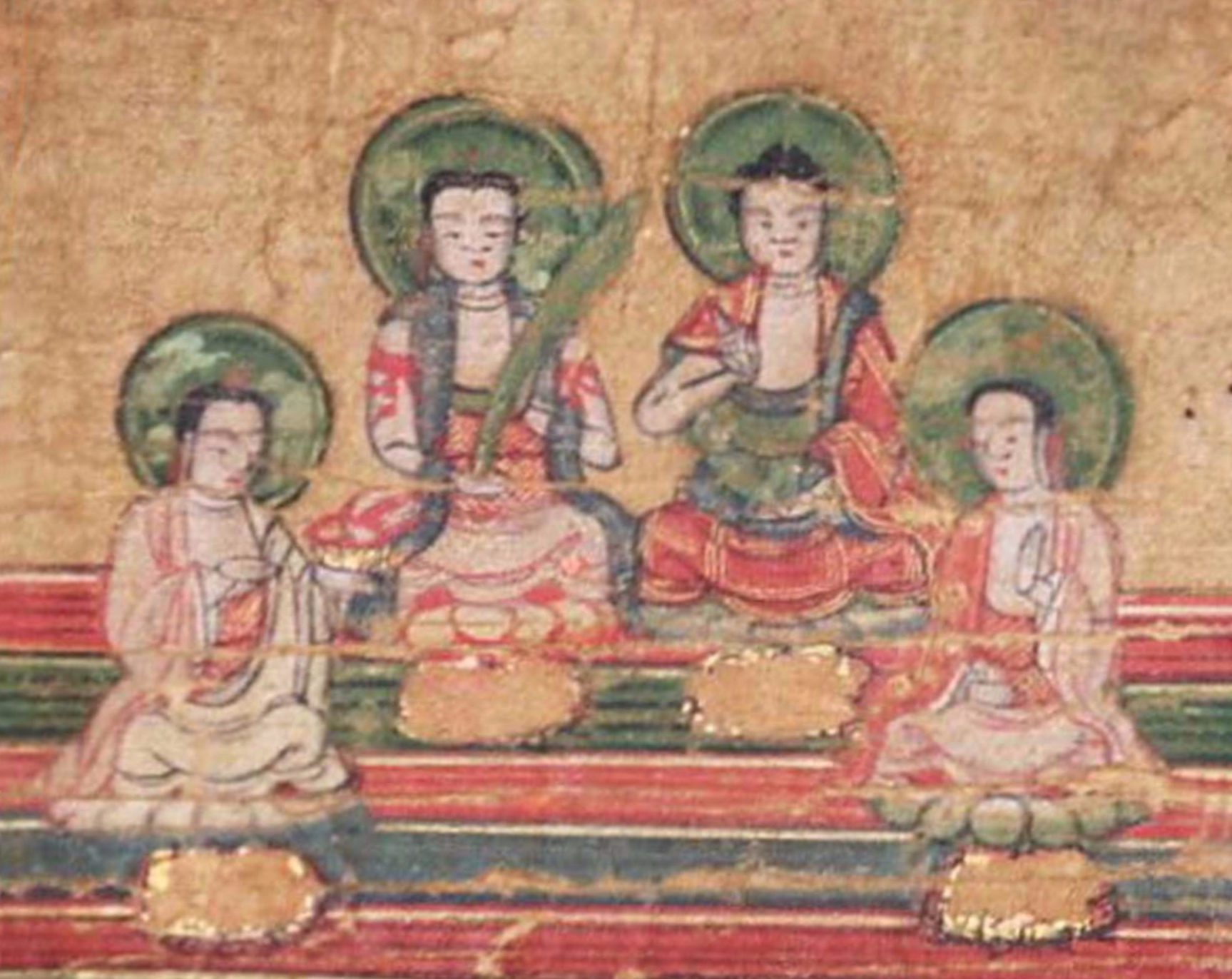
The four primary prophets of Manichaeism in the Manichaean Diagram of the Universe, from left to right: Mani, Zoroaster, Buddha and Jesus

=== Syncretism and translation ===
Manichaeism claimed to present the purified and completed teachings of Adam, Abraham, Noah, Zoroaster, the Buddha, and Jesus that had become corrupted and misinterpreted. Accordingly, as it spread, it adapted deities from other religions into forms it could use for its scriptures. Its original Eastern Middle Aramaic texts already contained stories of Jesus.

As the faith spread eastward and its scriptures were translated into Iranian languages, the names of the Manichaean deities were often transformed into those of Zoroastrian yazatas. Thus, Abbā ḏəRabbūṯā ("The Father of Greatness"), the highest Manichaean deity of Light, in Middle Persian texts might either be translated literally as pīd ī wuzurgīh or substituted with the name of the deity Zurwān.

Similarly, the Manichaean primordial figure Nāšā Qaḏmāyā ("The Original Man") was rendered Ohrmazd Bay after the Zoroastrian god Ohrmazd. This process continued in Manichaeism's meeting with Chinese Buddhism, during which, for example, the original Aramaic קריא qaryā (the "call" from the World of Light to those seeking rescue from the World of Darkness) is identified in the Chinese-language scriptures with Guanyin (觀音 or Avalokiteśvara in Sanskrit, literally, "watching/perceiving sounds [of the world]", the bodhisattva of Compassion).

Manichaeism influenced some early texts and traditions of proto-orthodox and other forms of early Christianity, as well as doing the same for branches of Zoroastrianism, Judaism, Buddhism, and Islam.

=== Persecution and suppression ===
Manichaeism was repressed by the Sasanian Empire. In 291, persecution arose in the Persian empire with the murder of the apostle Sisin by Bahram II and the slaughter of many Manichaeans. In 296, the Roman emperor Diocletian decreed that all the Manichaean leaders be burnt alive along with the Manichaean scriptures, and many Manichaeans in Europe and North Africa were killed. It was not until 372 with Valentinian I and Valens that Manichaeism was legislated against again.

Theodosius I issued a death decree for all Manichaean monks in 382. The religion was vigorously attacked and persecuted by both the Christian Church and the Roman state, and the religion almost disappeared from western Europe in the fifth century and from the eastern portion of the empire in the sixth century.

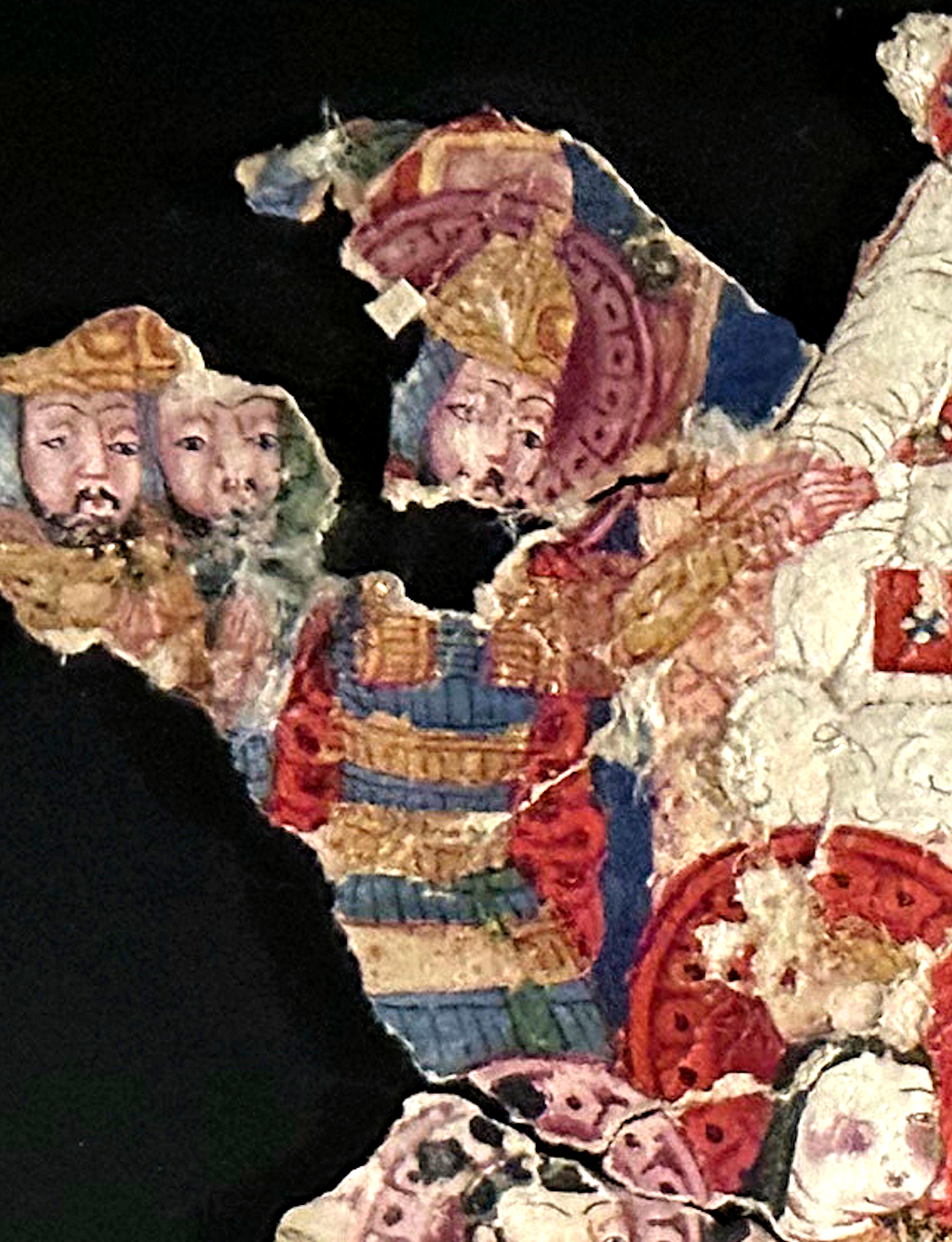
Conversion of Bögü Qaghan, third Khagan of the Uyghur Khaganate, to Manicheism in 762: detail of Bögü Qaghan in a suit of armour, kneeling to a Manichean high priest. 8th century Manichean manuscript (MIK III 4979)

In 732, Emperor Xuanzong of Tang banned any Chinese from converting to the religion, calling it a heretical religion and confusing people by claiming it was Buddhism. However, the foreigners who followed the religion were allowed to practice it without punishment. After the fall of the Uyghur Khaganate in 840, which was the chief patron of Manichaeism (which was also the state religion of the Khaganate) in China, all Manichaean temples in China except in the two capitals and Taiyuan were closed down and never reopened since these temples were viewed as a symbol of foreign arrogance by the Chinese (see Cao'an). Even those that were allowed to remain open did not for long.

The Manichaean temples were attacked by Chinese people who burned the images and idols of these temples. Manichaean priests were ordered to wear hanfu instead of traditional clothing, viewed as un-Chinese. In 843, Emperor Wuzong of Tang gave the order to kill all Manichaean clerics as part of the Huichang persecution of Buddhism, and over half died. They were made to look like Buddhists by the authorities; their heads were shaved, they were made to dress like Buddhist monks, and then killed.

Many Manichaeans took part in rebellions against the Song dynasty. They were quelled by Song China and were suppressed and persecuted by all successive governments before the Mongol Yuan dynasty. In 1370, the religion was banned through an edict of the Ming dynasty, whose Hongwu Emperor had a personal dislike for the religion. Its core teaching influences many religious sects in China, including the White Lotus movement.

According to Wendy Doniger, Manichaeism may have continued to exist in the Xinjiang region until the Mongol conquest in the 13th century.

Manicheans also suffered persecution for some time under the Abbasid Caliphate of Baghdad. In 780, the third Abbasid Caliph, al-Mahdi, launched a campaign of inquisition against those who were "dualist heretics" or "Manichaeans," known as the zindīq. He appointed a "master of the heretics" (Arabic: صاحب الزنادقة ṣāhib al-zanādiqa), an official whose task was to pursue and investigate suspected dualists, who the Caliph then examined. Those found guilty who refused to recant their beliefs were executed.

This persecution continued under his successor, Caliph al-Hadi, and persisted for some time during the reign of Harun al-Rashid, who finally abolished it. During the reign of the 18th Abbasid Caliph al-Muqtadir, many Manichaeans fled from Mesopotamia to Khorasan from fear of persecution by him, and about 500 of them assembled in Samarkand. The religion's base was later shifted to this city, which became its new Patriarchate.

Manichaean pamphlets were still in circulation in Greek in 9th-century Byzantine Constantinople, as the patriarch Photios summarizes and discusses one that he has read by Agapius in his Bibliotheca.

=== Later movements associated with Manichaeism ===
During the Middle Ages, several movements emerged that were collectively described as "Manichaean" by the Catholic Church and persecuted as Christian heresies through the establishment of the Inquisition in 1184. They included the Cathar churches of Western Europe. Other groups, sometimes referred to as "neo-Manichaean," were the Paulician movement, which arose in Armenia, and the Bogomils in Bulgaria and Serbia. An example of this usage can be found in the published edition of the Latin Cathar text, the Liber de duobus principiis (Book of the Two Principles), which was described as "Neo-Manichaean" by its publishers. As there is no presence of Manichaean mythology or church terminology in the writings of these groups, there has been some dispute among historians as to whether these groups were descendants of Manichaeism.

Manichaeism could have influenced the Bogomils, Paulicians, and Cathars. However, these groups left few records, and the link between them and Manichaeans is tenuous. Regardless of its accuracy, the charge of Manichaeism was leveled at them by contemporary orthodox opponents, who often tried to make contemporary heresies conform to those combatted by the church fathers.

Whether the dualism of the Paulicians, Bogomils, and Cathars, and their belief that the world was created by a Satanic demiurge, were influenced by Manichaeism is impossible to determine. The Cathars apparently adopted the Manichaean principles of church organization. Priscillian and his followers may also have been influenced by Manichaeism. The Manichaeans preserved many apocryphal Christian works, such as the Acts of Thomas, that would otherwise have been lost.

==== Legacy in present-day ====
Some sites are preserved in Xinjiang, Zhejiang, and Fujian in China. The Cao'an temple is the most widely-known and best-preserved Manichaean building, though it later became associated with Buddhism. Local villagers near Cao'an still worship Mani, albeit with little distinction between Mani-as-Buddha and Gautama Buddha. Other temples in China associated with Manichaeism remain standing, including the Xuanzhen Temple, noted for its stele.

Some platforms on the internet and social media are spreading some of the teachings of Manichaeism. Some people are registered in these electronic sources, and some scholars and students in the field of religious studies and the arts continue to study Manichaeism.

In 2018, rituals were conducted for the Lin Deng 林瞪 (1003–1059), a Chinese Manichaean leader who lived during the Song dynasty in the three villages of Baiyang 柏洋村, Shangwan 上萬村, and Tahou 塔後村 in Baiyang Township, Xiapu County, Fujian.

== Teachings and beliefs ==
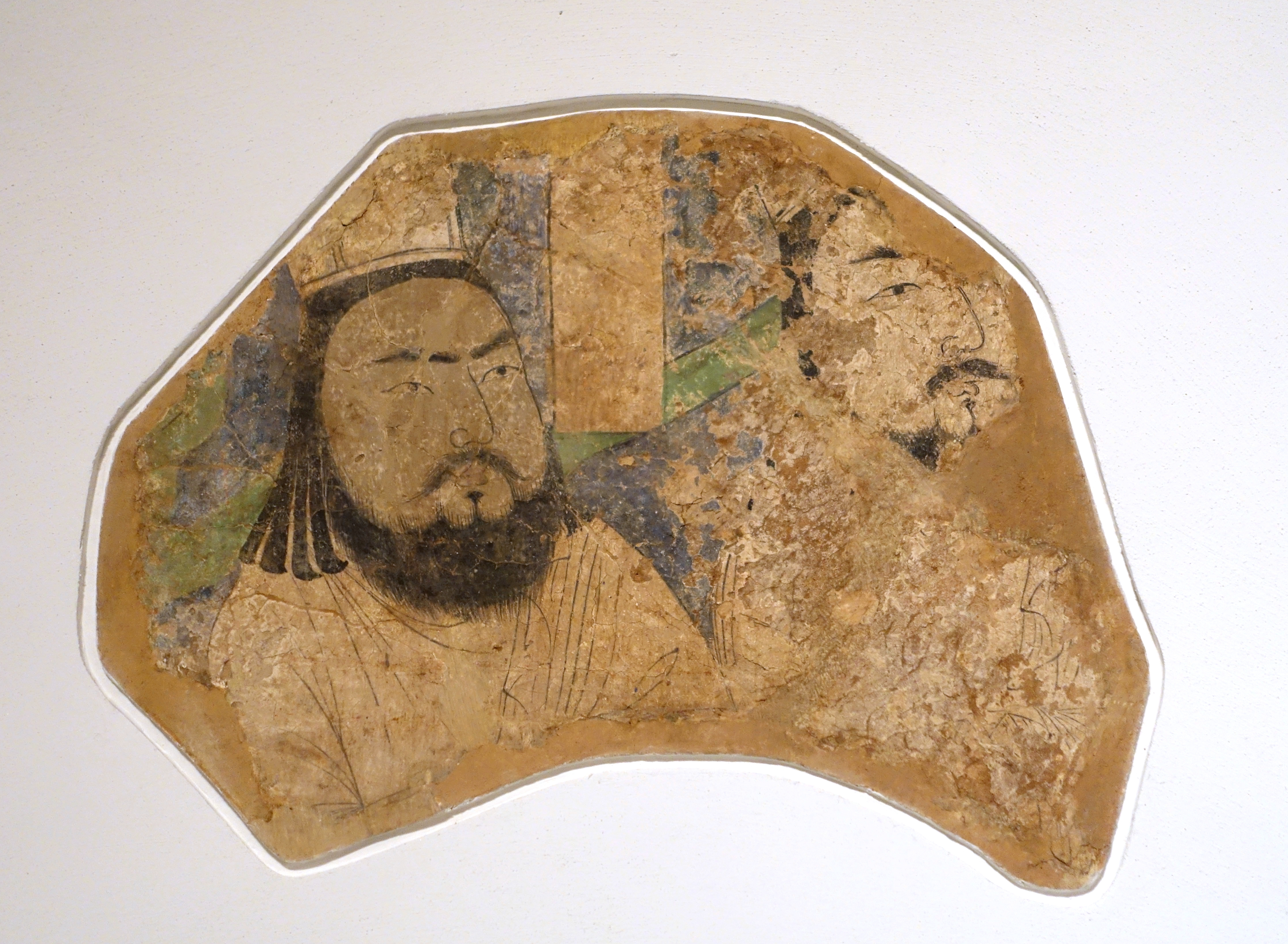
Uyghur Manichaean clergymen, wall painting from the Khocho ruins, 10th/11th century CE. Located in the Museum für Asiatische Kunst, Humboldt Forum, Berlin.

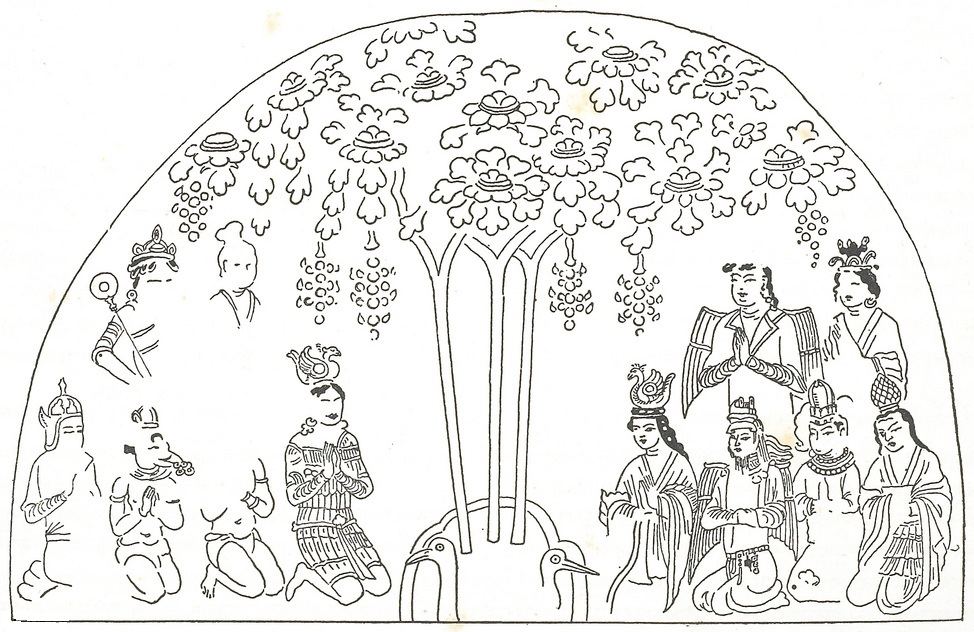
Worship of the Tree of Life in the World of Light; a Manichaean picture from the Bezeklik Caves

=== General ===
Mani's teaching addressed the origin of evil by focusing on a theoretical aspect of the problem of evil: denying the omnipotence of God and instead postulating two opposing divine powers. Manichaean theology teaches a dualistic view of good and evil. A fundamental belief in Manichaeism is that the powerful, though not omnipotent, good power (God) was opposed by the eternal evil power (the devil). Humanity, the world, and the soul are seen as the by-product of the battle between God's proxy—Primal Man—and the devil.

The human person is seen as a battleground for these powers: the soul defines the person, but is influenced by light and dark. This contention plays out across the world, and the human body—neither the Earth nor the flesh was seen as intrinsically evil, but instead both possessed both light and dark aspects. Natural phenomena such as rain were seen as the physical manifestation of this spiritual contention. Therefore, the Manichaean view explained the existence of evil by positing a flawed creation in the formation of which God took no part and which constituted the product of a battle by the devil against God instead.

=== Cosmogony ===
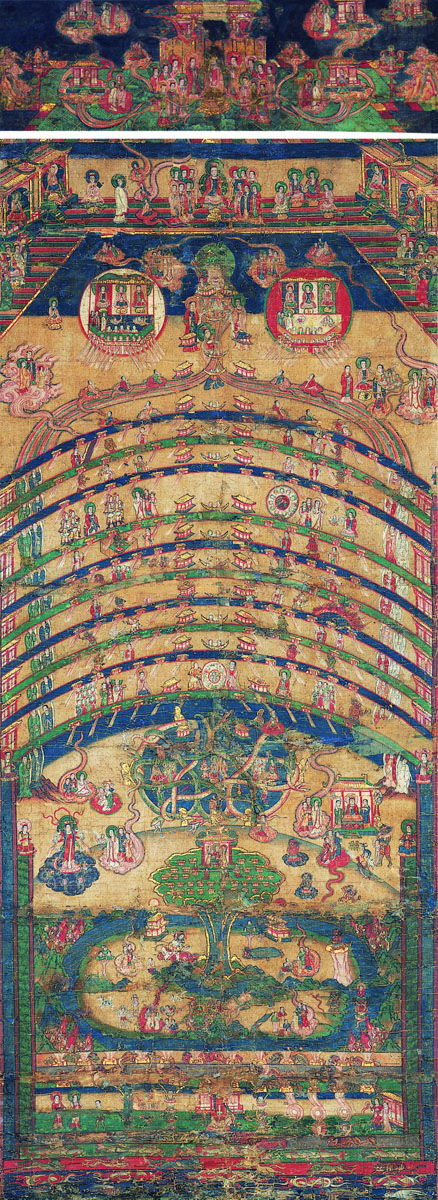
Manichaean Diagram of the Universe depicts the Manichaean cosmology.

Manichaeism presents an elaborate conflict between the spiritual world of light and the material world of darkness. The beings of both the world of darkness and the world of light have names. There are numerous sources detailing the Manichaean belief. Two portions of the scriptures are probably the closest thing to the original writings, in their original languages, that will ever be available: the Syriac quotation by the Church of the East Christian Theodore bar Konai in his 8th century Syriac scholion, known as the Ketba de-Skolion, and the Middle Persian sections of Mani's Shabuhragan discovered at Turpan—a summary of Mani's teachings prepared for Shapur I.

From these and other sources—the Acta Archelai and the writings of Alexander of Lycopolis, Titus of Bostra, Severus of Antioch, Theodoret, and Augustine of Hippo—Hans Jonas developed a working description of the Manichaean cosmogony. A complete list of Manichaean deities is outlined below. The unfolding of the universe in the Manichaean cosmogony took place in three phases:

=== The First Creation ===
Originally, good and evil existed in two completely separate realms: one, the World of Light (Chinese: 明界), ruled by the Father of Greatness together with his five Shekhinahs (i.e., divine attributes of light), and the other, the World of Darkness, ruled by the King of Darkness. At a point in the distant past, the Kingdom of Darkness noticed the World of Light, coveted it, and attacked it. The Father of Greatness, in the first of three "calls" or "creations", called to the Mother of Life, who sent her son, Original Man (Imperial Aramaic: Nāšā Qaḏmāyā), to battle with the attacking powers of Darkness, which included the Demon of Greed.

The Original Man was armed with five different shields of light (reflections of the five Shekhinahs), which he lost to the forces of Darkness in the ensuing battle—described as a kind of "bait" to trick the forces of Darkness, who greedily consume as much light as they can. When the Original Man awakened, he was trapped among the forces of Darkness.

=== The Second Creation ===
The Father of Greatness then began the Second Creation. He emanated a being called the Living Spirit, who then called to his sons and the Original Man, after which Call became a Manichaean deity proper. An answer—Answer—became another Manichaean deity, then went out from the Original Man into the World of Light. The Mother of Life, the Living Spirit, and the latter's five sons began to create the universe from the bodies of the evil beings of the World of Darkness and the light they had swallowed. Ten heavens and eight earths were created, all consisting of various mixtures of the evil material beings from the World of Darkness and the swallowed light. The sun, moon, and stars were all created from light recovered from the World of Darkness. The waxing and waning of the moon are described as the "moon filling with light", which passes to the sun, then through the Milky Way, and eventually back to the World of Light.

=== The Third Creation/Seduction of the Archons ===
Great demons (called archons in bar-Konai's account) were hung over the heavens, and the Father of Greatness began the Third Creation. The light was recovered from the material bodies of evil beings and demons by arousing their greed with beautiful images of the beings of light, such as the Third Messenger and the Virgins of Light. In Augustine of Hippo's account of Mani's writings, the Virgins of Light recovered light from the female and male archons by taking on the forms of both "beardless boys" and "beautiful virgins." According to other sources, including Al-Biruni's Kitab al-Hind and Ephrem the Syrian's Refutations of Mani, the myth included only one being (the Maiden of Light) with a transient or androgynous gender who performed the seduction, and in other versions there were multiple beings (shining warriors) which were sexless.

However, as soon as the light was expelled from their bodies and fell to the earth (sometimes in the form of abortions: the source of fallen angels in the Manichaean myth), the evil beings continued to swallow up as much of it as they could to keep the light inside themselves. The evil beings swallowed vast quantities of light, copulated, and produced Adam and Eve. The Father of Greatness then sent Jesus the Splendour to awaken Adam and enlighten him to the true source of the light trapped in his material body. Adam and Eve, however, also copulated and produced more human beings, trapping the light in humankind's bodies throughout human history. The appearance of the Prophet Mani was another attempt by the World of Light to reveal to humanity the true source of the spiritual light imprisoned within their material bodies.

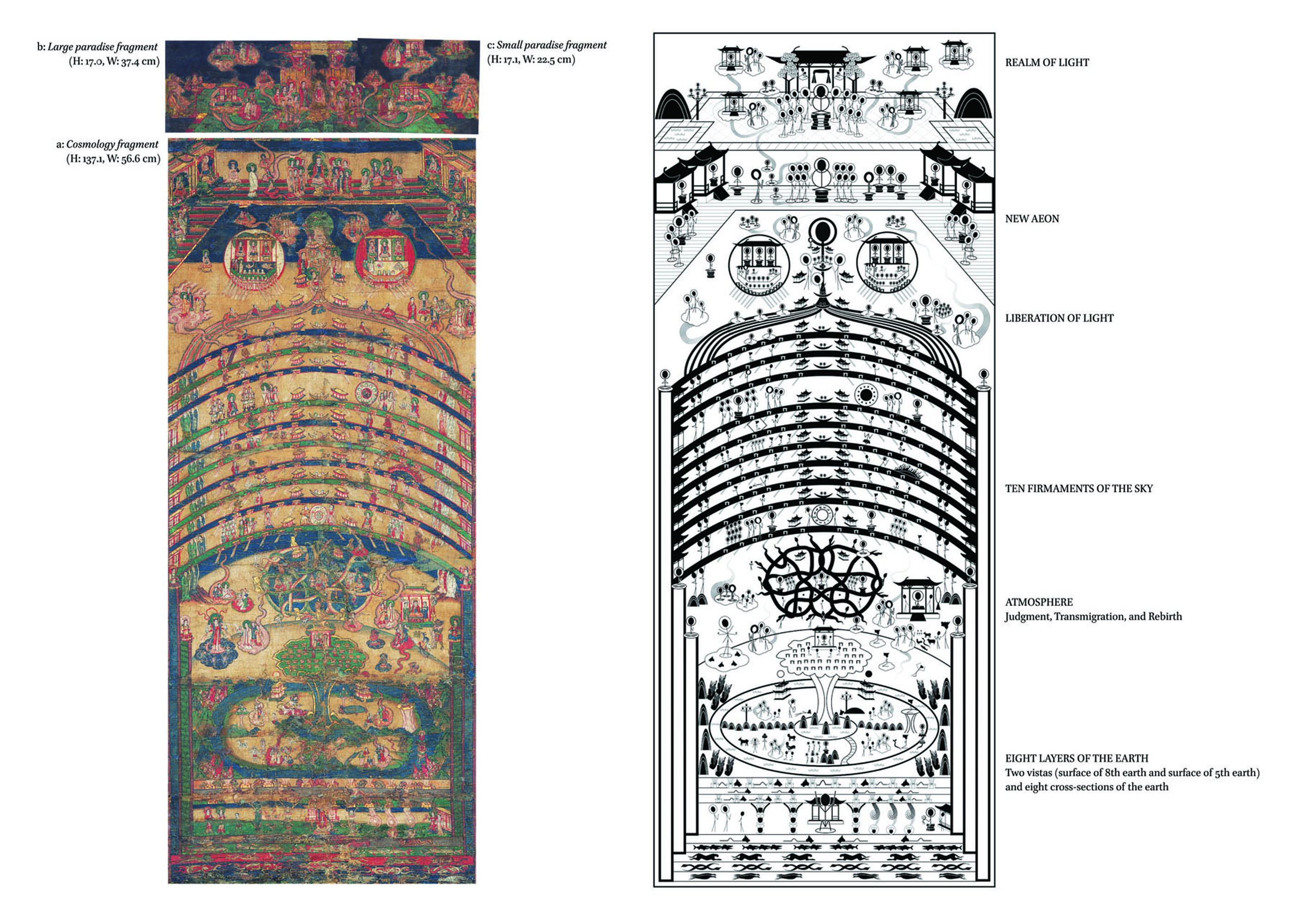
Analysis of Mani's cosmology as illustrated in the Manichaean Diagram

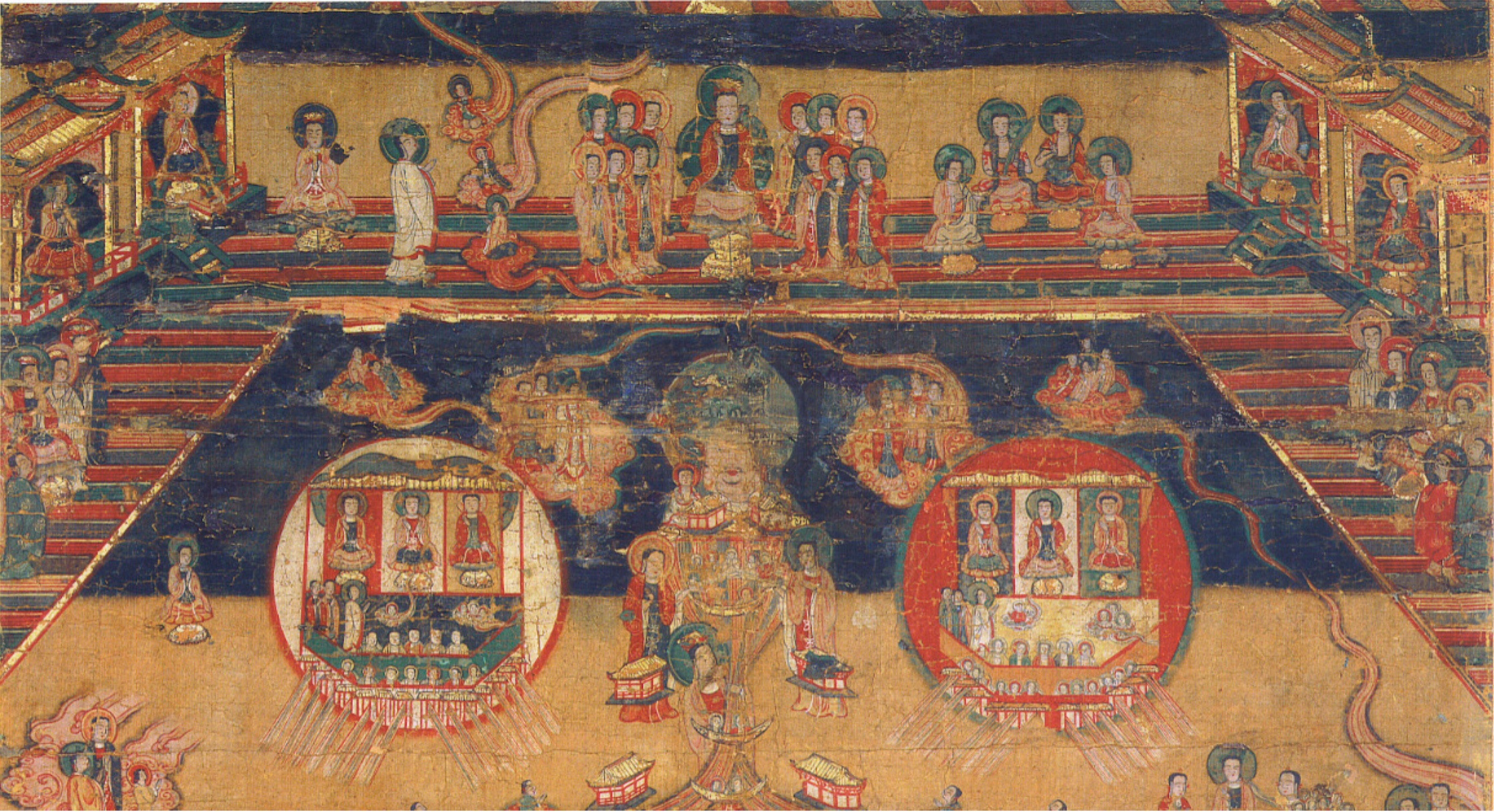
Heaven scene from the Manichaean Diagram

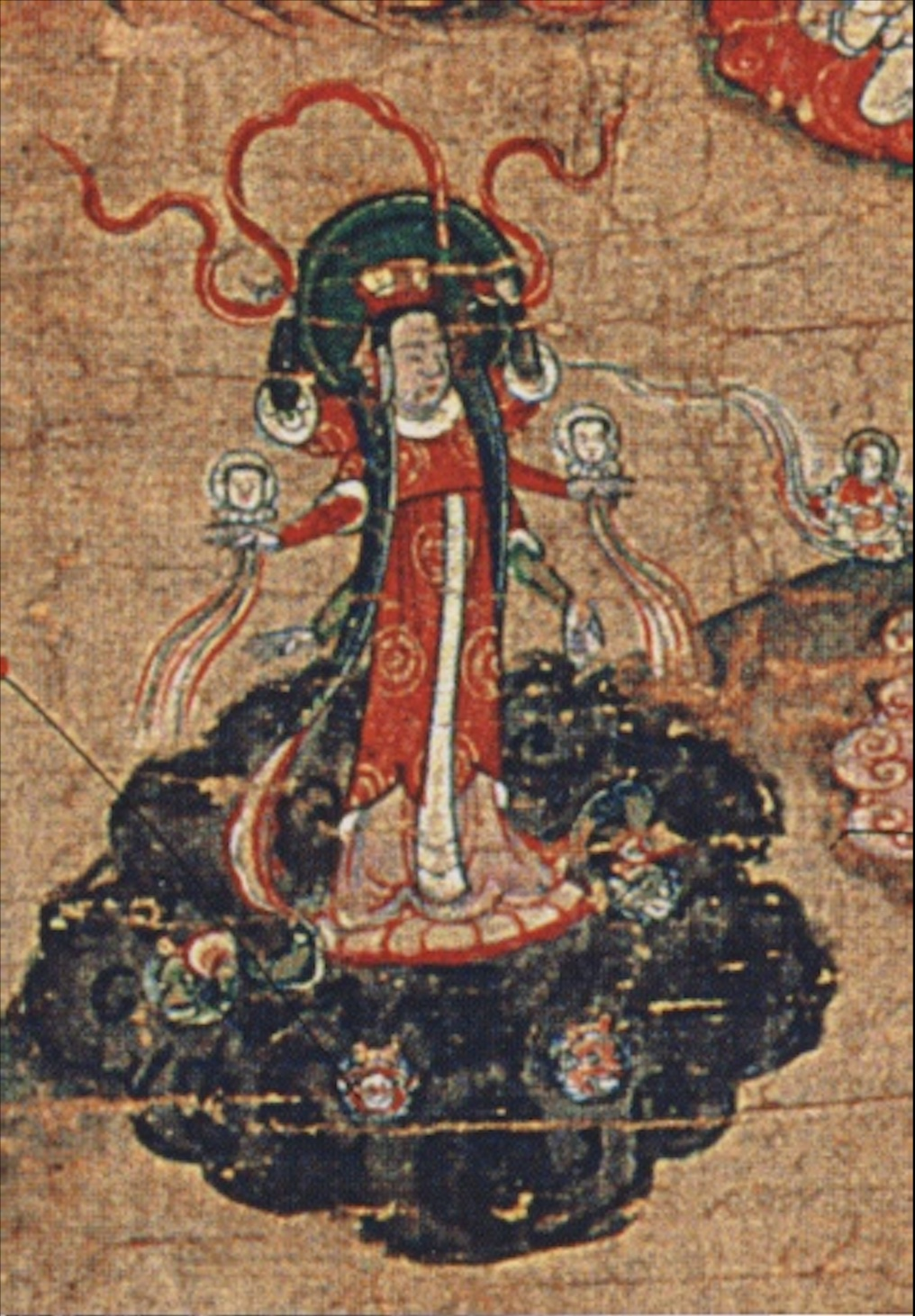
"Maiden of Light" from the Manichaean Diagram

==== Cosmology ====
In the sixth century, many Manichaeans saw the earth as "a rectangular parallelepiped enclosed by walls of crystal, above which three [sky] domes" existed, with the other two being above and larger than the first one and second one, respectively. These represented the "three heavens" in Chaldean religion.

=== Outline of the beings and events in Manichaean mythology ===
From its creation by Mani, the Manichaean religion has included a detailed description of deities and events within its scheme of the universe. In every language and region that Manichaeism spread to, these same deities reappear, whether it is in the original Syriac quoted by Theodore bar Konai, or the Latin terminology given by Saint Augustine from Mani's Epistola Fundamenti, or the Persian and Chinese translations found as Manichaeism spread eastward. While the original Syriac retained Mani's original description, the translation into other languages and cultures produced incarnations of the gods not implied in the original Syriac writings. Chinese translations are especially syncretic, borrowing and adapting terminology common in Chinese Buddhism.

==== The World of Light ====
- The Father of Greatness (Syriac: ܐܒܐ ܕܪܒܘܬܐ, romanized: Abbā dəRabbūṯā; Ancient Greek: Μέγεθος, romanized: Mégethos, πατήρ τοῦ μεγέθους patḗr toû megéthous; Middle Persian: pīd ī wuzurgīh, or the Zoroastrian deity Zurwān; Parthian: Pidar wuzurgift, Pidar roshn; Chinese: 無上明尊; lit. 'Unsurpassed Divinity of Light' or 薩緩, lit. 'Zurvan')
  - His Four Faces (Ancient Greek: τετραπρόσωπον, romanized: tetraprósōpon, ὁ τετραπρόσωπος πατήρ τοῦ μεγέθους, o tetraprósōpos patḗr toû megéthous; Chinese: 四寂法身; lit. 'Four Silent Dharmakayas')
    - Divinity (Middle Persian: yzd; Parthian: bg'; Chinese: 清净)
    - Light (Middle Persian and Parthian: rwšn; Chinese: 光明)
    - Power (Middle Persian: zwr; Parthian: z'wr'; Chinese: 大力)
    - Wisdom (Middle Persian: whyh; Parthian: jyryft; Chinese: 智慧)
  - His Five Shekhinas (Syriac: ܚܡܫ ܫܟܝܢܬܗ, romanized: khamesh shkhinatei; Chinese: 五種大, wǔ zhǒng dà, lit. 'five great ones'):

Shekhina:	Reason	Mind	Intelligence	Thought	Understanding
Syriac	ܗܘܢܐ hawnā	ܡܕܥܐ maddeʻā	ܪܥܝܢܐ reyānā	ܡܚܫܒܬܐ maḥšavṯɑ	ܬܪܥܝܬܐ tarʻiṯā
Parthian	bām	manohmēd	uš	andēšišn	parmānag
Chinese	相 xiāng, "phase"	心 xīn, "heart-mind"	念 niàn, "mindfulness"	思 sī, "thought"	意 yì, "meaning"
Turkic	qut	ög	köngül	saqinç	tuimaq
Greek	νοῦς (Nous)	ἔννοια (Ennoia)	φρόνησις (Phronēsis)	ἐνθύμησις (Enthymēsis)	λογισμός (Logismos)
Latin	mens	sensus	prudentia	intellectus	cogitatio

- The Great Spirit (Middle Persian: Waxsh zindag, Waxsh yozdahr; Latin: Spiritus Potens)

==== The first creation ====
- The Mother of Life (Syriac: ܐܡܐ ܕܚܝܐ imā dəḥayyē; Ancient Greek: μήτηρ τῆς ζωῆς, romanized: mētēr tēs zōēs; Latin: mater vitae; Middle Persian: mʾdrʾy zyndgʾn (mādar ī zīndagān); Chinese: 善母佛; lit. 'Good Mother Buddha'; Arabic: omm al-eḥyāʾ)
- The First Man (Syriac: ܐܢܫܐ ܩܕܡܝܐ Nāšā Qaḏmāyā; Latin: Primus Homo; Middle Persian: Ohrmazd Bay, the Zoroastrian god of light and goodness; Parthian: mard hasēnag; Arabic: al-ensān al-qadīm)
  - First Enthymesis (Middle Persian: hndyšyšn nxwysṯyn; Chinese: 先意; lit. 'First Understanding')
  - His five Sons (the five Light Elements; Parthian: panj rōšn; Middle Persian: Amahrāspandān; Chinese: 五明子)
    - Ether (Parthian: ardāw; Middle Persian: frāwahr; Chinese: 氣 qì; Greek: αἰθήρ; Latin: aethēr)
    - Wind (Parthian and Middle Persian: wād; Chinese: 風 fēng)
    - Light (Parthian and Middle Persian: rōšn; Chinese: 明 míng)
    - Water (Parthian and Middle Persian: āb; Chinese: 水 shuǐ)
    - Fire (Parthian and Middle Persian: ādur; Chinese: 火 huǒ)
  - His sixth Son, the Answer-God (Syriac: ܥܢܝܐ ʻanyā; Parthian and Middle Persian: xroshtag; Chinese: 勢至 Shì Zhì "The Power of Wisdom", a Chinese bodhisattva). The answer sent by the First Man to the Call from the World of Light.
- The Living Self (Parthian and Middle Persian: grīw zīndag, grīw rōšn; Chinese: 明性; lit. 'Light Nature') The anima mundi made up of the five Light Elements, identical with the Suffering Jesus who is crucified in the world.

==== The second creation ====
- The Friend of the Lights (Syriac: ܚܒܝܒ ܢܗܝܖܐ ḥaviv nehirē; Chinese: 樂明佛; lit. 'Enjoyer of Lights') Calls to:
- The Great Builder (Syriac: ܒܢ ܖܒܐ ban rabbā; Middle Persian: nōgšahrāfur-yazad, lit. ‘world creator’; Chinese: 造相; lit. 'Creator of Forms') In charge of creating the new world that will separate the darkness from the light. He calls to:
- The Living Spirit (Syriac: ܪܘܚܐ ܚܝܐ ruḥā ḥayyā; Middle Persian: Mihryazd; Chinese: 淨活風; pinyin: Jìnghuófēng; Latin: Spiritus Vivens; Greek: Ζων Πνευμα). Acts as a demiurge, creating the structure of the material world.
  - His five Sons (Syriac: ܚܡܫܐ ܒܢܘܗܝ ḥamšā benawhy; Chinese: 五等驍健子; lit. 'Five Valiant Sons')
    - The Keeper of the Splendour (Syriac: ܨܦܬ ܙܝܘܐ ṣfat ziwā; Latin: Splenditenens; Chinese: 催光明使; lit. 'Urger of Enlightenment'). Holds up the ten heavens from above.
    - The King of Glory (Syriac: ܡܠܟ ܫܘܒܚܐ mlex šuvḥā; Latin: Gloriosus Rex; Chinese: 地藏 Dìzàng "Earth Treasury", a Chinese bodhisattva).
    - The Adamas of Light (Syriac: ܐܕܡܘܣ ܢܘܗܪܐ adamus nuhrā; Latin: Adamas Heros; Sogdian: wašaγni βaγi; Chinese: 降魔使; pinyin: Jiàngmó shǐ). Fights with and overcomes an evil being in the image of the King of Darkness.
    - The Great King of Honour (Syriac: ܡܠܟܐ ܪܒܐ ܕܐܝܩܪܐ malkā rabbā dikkārā; Dead Sea Scrolls Imperial Aramaic: מלכא רבא דאיקרא malka raba de-ikara; Latin: Rex Honoris; Chinese: 十天大王; pinyin: Shítiān Dàwáng; lit. 'Ten Heavens Great King'). A being that plays a central role in The Book of Enoch (originally written in Aramaic), as well as Mani's Syriac version of it, the Book of Giants. Sits in the seventh heaven of the ten heavens (corresponding to the celestial spheres, the first seven of which house the classical planets) and guards the entrance to the world of light. In the Syriac Aramaic account, the guarded entrance is called the maṭarta (Syriac: ܡܛܪܬܐ maṭarta).
    - Atlas (Syriac: ܣܒܠܐ sebblā; Ancient Greek: ’Ωμοϕόρος, romanized: Ōmophóros; Latin: Atlas Maximus; Chinese: 持世主; pinyin: Chíshìzhǔ). Supports the eight worlds from below.
  - His sixth Son, the Call-God (Syriac: ܩܪܝܐ qaryā; Middle Persian: Padvaxtag; Chinese: 觀音 Guanyin "watching/perceiving sounds [of the world]", the Chinese Bodhisattva of Compassion). Sent from the Living Spirit to awaken the First Man from his battle with the forces of darkness.

==== The third creation ====
- The Third Messenger (Syriac: ܐܝܙܓܕܐ izgaddā; Middle Persian: narēsahyazad; Parthian: hridīg frēštag; Latin: tertius legatus)
- Jesus the Splendour (Syriac: ܝܫܘܥ ܙܝܘܐ Ishoʻ Ziwā; Chinese: 光明夷數; lit. 'Jesus of Bright Light' or 夷數精和 lit. 'Jesus the Essence of Harmony'). He was sent to awaken Adam and Eve to the source of the spiritual light trapped within their bodies.
- The Maiden of Light (Middle Persian and Parthian: qnygrwšn; Chinese: 謹你嚧詵, a phonetic loan from Middle Persian)
- The Twelve Virgins of Light (Syriac: ܬܪܬܥܣܪܐ ܒܬܘܠܬܐ tratʻesrā btultē; Middle Persian: kanīgān rōšnān; Chinese: 日宮十二化女; pinyin: Rìgōng shí'èr huànǚ; lit. 'Sun Palace Twelve Maidens of Transformation'). (Note: These are apparently the 'twelve centuries clothed with flowers and full of melodies' (duodecim saecula floribus convestita et canoribus plena) at St Augustine, Contra Faustum 15.5) Reflected in the twelve constellations of the Zodiac.
- The Column of Glory (Syriac: ܐܣܛܘܢ ܫܘܒܚܐ esṭun šuvḥā; Latin: columna gloriae; Middle Persian: srōš-ahrāy; Parthian: bāmistūn; Chinese: 蘇露沙羅夷; pinyin: Sūlù shāluóyí and 盧舍那, Lúshěnà, both phonetic from Middle Persian: srōš-ahrāy; Arabic: ʿamūd al-sobḥ). Souls' path to the World of Light corresponds to the Milky Way.
- The Great Nous
  - His five Limbs (Chinese: 五體) (See "His Five Shekhinas" above.)
    - Reason
    - Mind
    - Intelligence
    - Thought
    - Understanding
- The Just Judge (Parthian: d'dbr r'štygr; Chinese: 平等王; lit. 'Impartial King')
- The Last God

==== The World of Darkness ====
- The Prince of Darkness (Syriac: ܡܠܟ ܚܫܘܟܐ mlex ḥešoxā; Coptic: prro mpkeke; Middle Persian and Parthian: ʾhrmyn Ahremen, the Zoroastrian supreme evil being; Greek: ἄρχων τοῦ σκότους árchon toû skótous; Latin: princeps tenebrarum)
  - His five evil kingdoms: Evil counterparts of the five elements of light, the lowest being the kingdom of Darkness.
  - His son (Syriac: ܐܫܩܠܘܢ Ašqalūn; Middle Persian: Āz, from the Zoroastrian demon, Aži Dahāka; Parthian and Sogdian: šklwn, šqlwn; Greek: Saklas)
  - His son's consort (Syriac: ܢܒܪܘܐܠ Nebrō’ēl; Middle Persian: Afsōsag; Parthian and Sogdian: Pēsūs; Chinese: Ye-luo-yang)
  - Their offspring – Adam and Eve (Middle Persian: Gehmurd and Murdiyanag, or noxwīr, lit. ‘first man’, and farrahān srīgar, lit. ‘the female of the glories’)
- Giants (Fallen Angels, also Abortions): (Syriac: ܝܚܛܐ yaḥtē, "abortions" or "those that fell"; also: ܐܪܟܘܢܬܐ; Middle Persian: ʾbgʾngʾn; Sogdian: pšʾq, pjwq; Greek: Ἐγρήγοροι Egrēgoroi, "Watchers"; Coptic: egrēgoros). Related to the story of the fallen angels in the Book of Enoch (which Mani used extensively in The Book of Giants), and the נפילים nephilim described in Genesis (6:1–4).

== The Manichaean Church ==
=== Organization ===
The Manichaean Church was divided into the Elect, who had taken upon themselves the vows of Manichaeism, and the Hearers, those who had not, but still participated in the Church. The Elect were forbidden to consume alcohol and meat, as well as to harvest crops or prepare food, due to Mani's claim that harvesting was a form of murder against plants. The Hearers would therefore commit the sin of preparing food, and would provide it to the Elect, who would in turn pray for the Hearers and cleanse them of these sins.

The terms for these divisions were already common since the days of early Christianity, however, it had a different meaning in Christianity. In Chinese writings, the Middle Persian and Parthian terms are transcribed phonetically (instead of being translated into Chinese). These were recorded by Augustine of Hippo.

- The Leader (Syriac: ܟܗܢܐ /kɑhnɑ/; Ancient Greek: ἀρχηγός, romanized: archēgós; Parthian: yamag; Chinese: 閻默; pinyin: yánmò), Mani's designated successor, seated as Patriarch at the head of the Church, originally in Ctesiphon, from the ninth century in Samarkand. Two notable leaders were Mār Sīsin (or Sisinnios), the first successor of Mani, and Abū Hilāl al-Dayhūri, an eighth-century leader.
- 12 Apostles (Latin: magistrī; Syriac: ܫܠܝܚܐ /ʃ(ə)liħe/; Middle Persian: možag; Chinese: 慕闍; pinyin: mùdū). Three of Mani's original apostles were Mār Pattī (Pattikios; Mani's father), Akouas and Mar Ammo.
- 72 Bishops (Latin: episcopī; Syriac: ܐܦܣܩܘܦܐ /ʔappisqoppe/; Middle Persian: aspasag, aftadan; Chinese: 薩波塞; pinyin: sàbōsāi or Chinese: 拂多誕; pinyin: fúduōdàn; see also: seventy disciples). One of Mani's original disciples who was specifically referred to as a bishop was Mār Addā.
- 360 Presbyters (Latin: presbyterī; Syriac: ܩܫܝܫܐ /qaʃʃiʃe/; Middle Persian: mahistan; Chinese: 默奚悉德; pinyin: mòxīxīdé)
- The general body of the Elect (Latin: ēlēctī; Syriac: ܡܫܡܫܢܐ /m(ə)ʃamməʃɑne/; Middle Persian: ardawan or dēnāwar; Chinese: 阿羅緩; pinyin: āluóhuǎn or Chinese: 電那勿; pinyin: diànnàwù)
- The Hearers (Latin: audītōrēs; Syriac: ܫܡܘܥܐ /ʃɑmoʿe/; Middle Persian: niyoshagan; Chinese: 耨沙喭; pinyin: nòushāyàn)

== Religious practices ==
=== Prayers ===
From Manichaean sources, Manichaeans observed daily prayers: four for the hearers or seven for the elect. The sources differ about the exact time of prayer. The Fihrist by al-Nadim appoints them afternoon, mid-afternoon, just after sunset, and at nightfall. Al-Biruni places the prayers at dawn, sunrise, noon, and dusk. The elect additionally prayed at mid-afternoon, half an hour after nightfall, and midnight. Al-Nadim's account of daily prayers is probably adjusted to coincide with the public prayers for the Muslims, while Al-Biruni's report may reflect an older tradition unaffected by Islam.

When Al-Nadim's account of daily prayers was the only detailed source available, there was a concern that Manicheans only adopted these practices during the Abbasid Caliphate. However, it is clear that the Arabic text provided by Al-Nadim corresponds with the descriptions of Egyptian texts from the fourth century.

Every prayer started with an ablution with water or, if water was not available, with other substances comparable to ablution in Islam, and consisted of several blessings to the apostles and spirits. The prayer consisted of prostrating oneself to the ground and rising again twelve times during every prayer. During the day, Manichaeans turned towards the Sun and during the night towards the Moon. If the Moon is not visible at night, they turned towards the north.

Evident from Faustus of Mileve, Celestial bodies are not the subject of worship themselves but are "ships" carrying the light particles of the world to the supreme god, who cannot be seen, since he exists beyond time and space, and also the dwelling places for emanations of the supreme deity, such as Jesus the Splendour. According to the writings of Augustine of Hippo, ten prayers were performed, the first devoted to the Father of Greatness, and the following to lesser deities, spirits, and angels and finally towards the elect, to be freed from rebirth and pain and to attain peace in the realm of light. Comparably, in the Uyghur confession, four prayers are directed to the supreme God (Äzrua), the God of the Sun and the Moon, and fivefold God and the buddhas.

== Primary sources ==
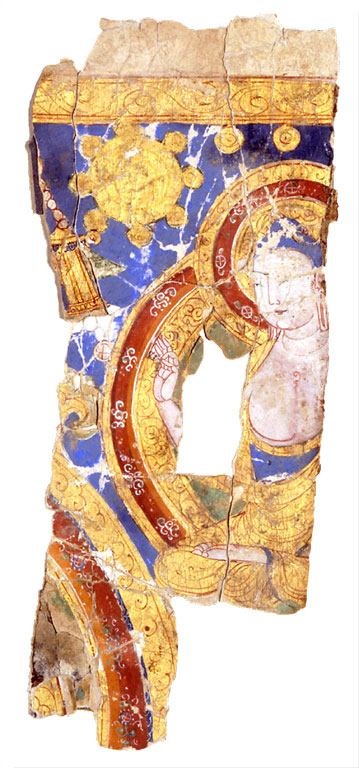
An image of the Buddha as one of the primary prophets on a Manichaean pictorial roll fragment from Chotscho, 10th century

Mani wrote seven books, which contained the teachings of the religion. Only scattered fragments and translations of the originals remain, most having been discovered in Egypt and Turkistan during the 20th century.

The original six Syriac writings are not preserved, although their Syriac names have been. There are also fragments and quotations from them. A long quotation, preserved by the eighth century Nestorian Christian author Theodore Bar Konai, shows that in the original Syriac Aramaic writings of Mani there was no influence of Iranian or Zoroastrian terms. The terms for the Manichaean deities in the original Syriac writings are in Aramaic. The adaptation of Manichaeism to the Zoroastrian religion appears to have begun in Mani's lifetime however, with his writing of the Middle Persian Shabuhragan, his book dedicated to the Sasanian emperor, Shapur I.

In it, there are mentions of Zoroastrian divinities such as Ahura Mazda, Angra Mainyu, and Āz. Manichaeism is often presented as a Persian religion, mostly due to the vast number of Middle Persian, Parthian, and Sogdian (as well as Turkish) texts discovered by German researchers near Turpan in what is now Xinjiang, China, during the early 1900s. However, from the vantage point of its original Syriac descriptions (as quoted by Theodore Bar Khonai and outlined above), Manichaeism may be better described as a unique phenomenon of Aramaic Babylonia, occurring in proximity to two other new Aramaic religious phenomena, Talmudic Judaism and Mandaeism, which also appeared in Babylonia in roughly the third century.

The original, but now lost, six sacred books of Manichaeism were composed in Syriac Aramaic, and translated into other languages to help spread the religion. As they spread to the east, the Manichaean writings passed through Middle Persian, Parthian, Sogdian, Tocharian, and ultimately Uyghur and Chinese translations. As they spread to the west, they were translated into Greek, Coptic, and Latin. Most Manichaean texts survived only as Coptic and Medieval Chinese translations of their original, lost versions.

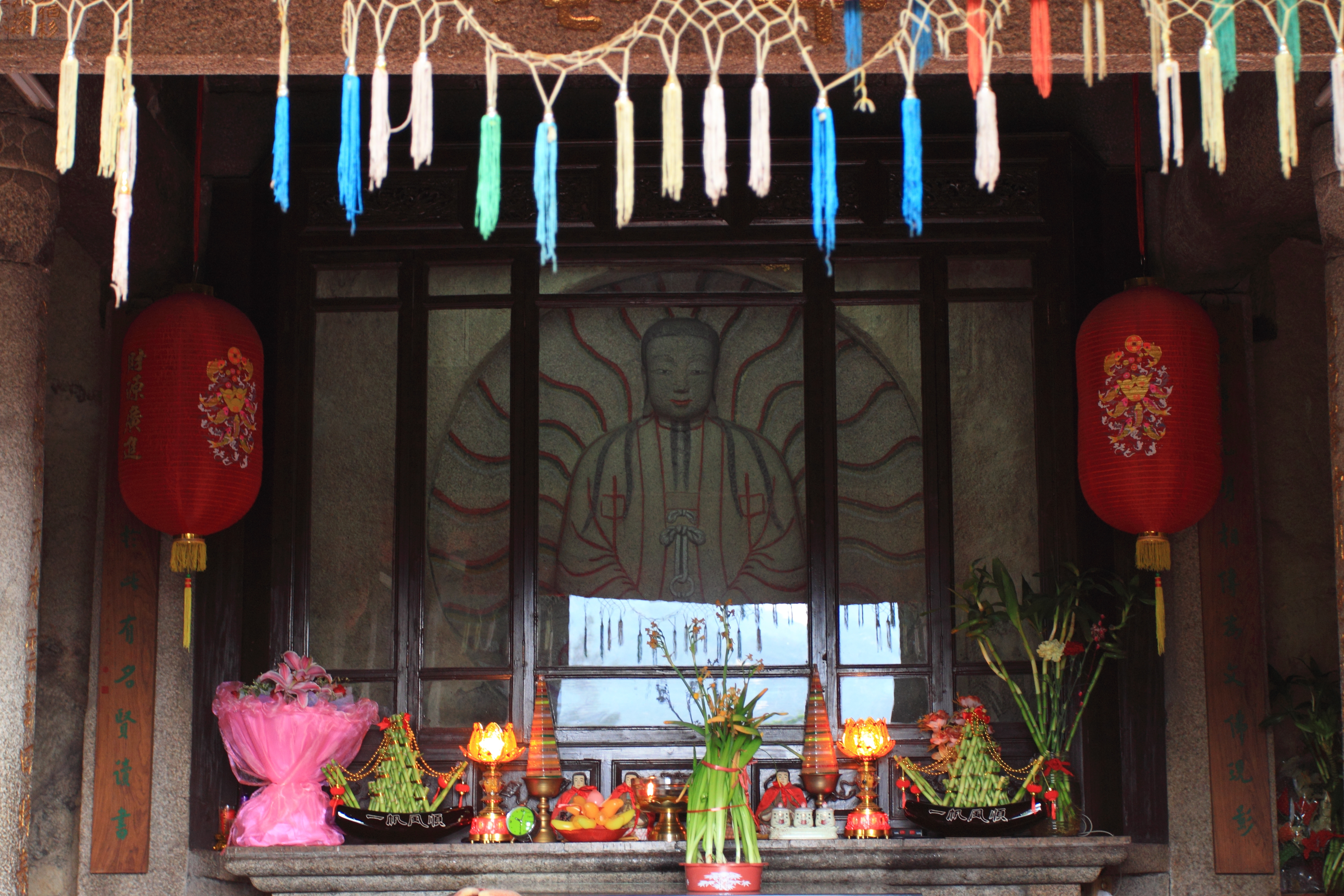
Statue of prophet Mani as the "Buddha of Light" in Cao'an Temple in Jinjiang, Fujian, "a Manichaean temple in Buddhist disguise", which is considered "the only extant Manichean temple in China"

Henning describes how this translation process evolved and influenced the Manichaeans of Central Asia:

Beyond doubt, Sogdian was the national language of the Majority of clerics and propagandists of the Manichaean faith in Central Asia. Middle Persian (Pārsīg), and to a lesser degree, Parthian (Pahlavānīg), occupied the position held by Latin in the medieval church. The founder of Manichaeism had employed Syriac (his own language) as his medium, but conveniently he had written at least one book in Middle Persian, and it is likely that he himself had arranged for the translation of some or all of his numerous writings from Syriac into Middle Persian. Thus the Eastern Manichaeans found themselves entitled to dispense with the study of Mani's original writings, and to continue themselves to reading the Middle Persian edition; it presented small difficulty to them to acquire a good knowledge of the Middle Persian language, owing to its affinity with Sogdian.

=== Originally written in Syriac ===
- the Gospel of Mani (Syriac: ܐܘܢܓܠܝܘܢ /ʔɛwwanɡallijon/; Koine Greek: εὐαγγέλιον "good news, gospel"). Quotations from the first chapter were brought in Arabic by ibn al-Nadim, who lived in Baghdad at a time when there were still Manichaeans living there, in his 938 book, the Fihrist, a catalog of all written books known to him.
- The Treasure of Life
- The Treatise (Coptic: πραγματεία, pragmateia)
- Secrets
- The Book of Giants: Original fragments were discovered at Qumran (pre-Manichaean) and Turpan.
- Epistles: Augustine brings quotations, in Latin, from Mani's Fundamental Epistle in some of his anti-Manichaean works.
- Psalms and Prayers: A Coptic Manichaean Psalm Book, discovered in Egypt in the early 1900s, was edited and published by Charles Allberry from Manichaean manuscripts in the Chester Beatty collection and in the Berlin Academy, 1938–39.

=== Originally written in Middle Persian ===
- The Shabuhragan, dedicated to Shapur I: Original Middle Persian fragments were discovered at Turpan, quotations were brought in Arabic by al-Biruni.

=== Other books ===
- The Ardahang, the "Picture Book". In Iranian tradition, this was one of Mani's holy books that became remembered in later Persian history, and was also called Aržang, a Parthian word meaning "Worthy", and was beautified with paintings. Therefore, Iranians gave him the title of "The Painter".
- The Kephalaia of the Teacher (Κεφαλαια), "Discourses", found in Coptic translation.
- On the Origin of His Body, the title of the Cologne Mani-Codex, a Greek translation of an Aramaic book that describes the early life of Mani.

=== Non-Manichaean works preserved by the Manichaean Church ===
- Portions of the Book of Enoch literature such as the Book of Giants.
- Literature relating to the apostle Thomas (who by tradition went to India, and was also venerated in Syria), such as portions of the Syriac The Acts of Thomas, and the Psalms of Thomas. The Gospel of Thomas was also attributed to Manichaeans by Cyril of Jerusalem, a fourth-century Church Father.
- The legend of Barlaam and Josaphat passed from an Indian story about Shakyamuni Buddha, through a Manichaean version, before it transformed into the story of a Christian Saint in the west.

=== Later works ===
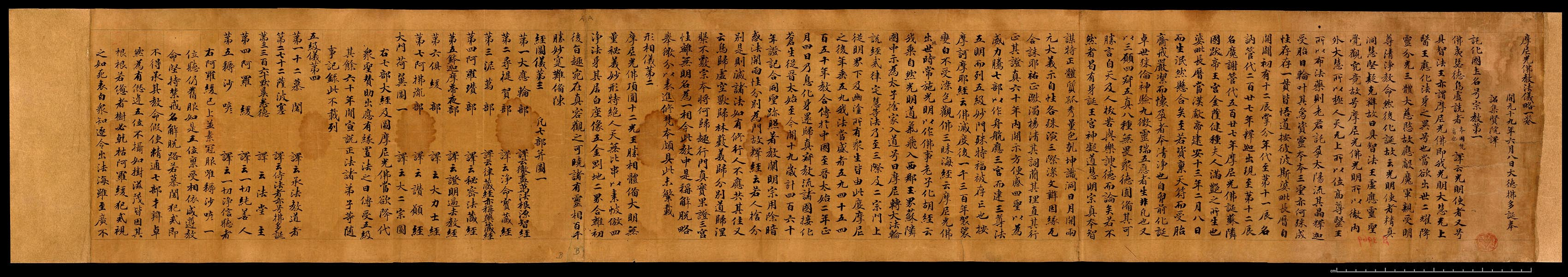
摩尼教文獻 The Chinese Manichaean "Compendium"

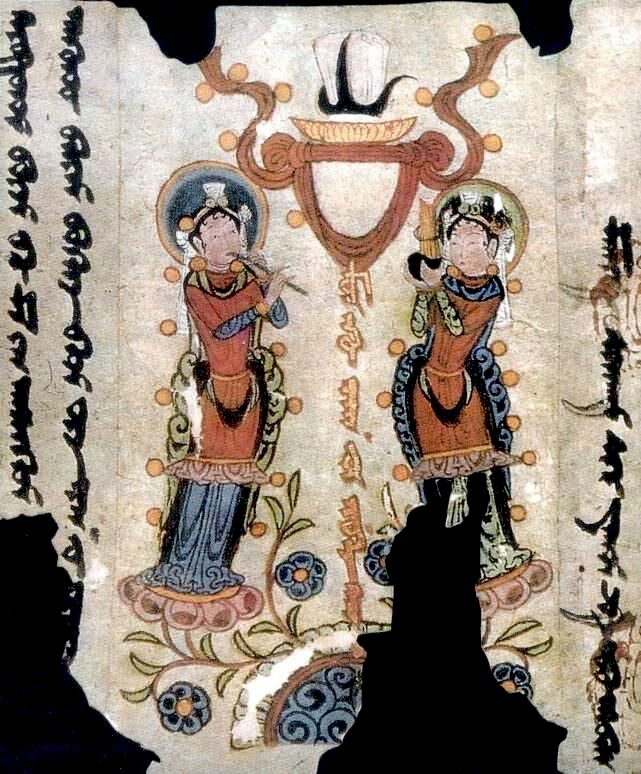
Two female musicians depicted in a Manichaean text

In later centuries, as Manichaeism passed through eastern Persian-speaking lands and arrived at the Uyghur Khaganate (回鶻帝國), and eventually the Uyghur kingdom of Turpan (destroyed around 1335), Middle Persian and Parthian prayers (āfrīwan or āfurišn) and the Parthian hymn-cycles (the Huwīdagmān and Angad Rōšnan created by Mar Ammo) were added to the Manichaean writings. A translation of a collection of these produced the Manichaean Chinese Hymnscroll (Chinese: 摩尼教下部讚; pinyin: Móní-jiào Xiàbù Zàn, which Lieu translates as "Hymns for the Lower Section [i.e. the Hearers] of the Manichaean Religion").

In addition to containing hymns attributed to Mani, it contains prayers attributed to Mani's earliest disciples, including Mār Zaku, Mār Ammo and Mār Sīsin. Another Chinese work is a complete translation of the Sermon of the Light Nous, presented as a discussion between Mani and his disciple Adda.

=== Critical and polemic sources ===
Until discoveries in the 1900s of original sources, the only sources for Manichaeism were descriptions and quotations from non-Manichaean authors, either Christian, Muslim, Buddhist, or Zoroastrian ones. While often criticizing Manichaeism, they also quoted directly from Manichaean scriptures. This enabled Isaac de Beausobre, writing in the 18th century, to create a comprehensive work on Manichaeism, relying solely on anti-Manichaean sources. Thus quotations and descriptions in Greek and Arabic have long been known to scholars, as have the long quotations in Latin by Saint Augustine, and the extremely important quotation in Syriac by Theodore Bar Konai.

==== Patristic depictions of Mani and Manichaeism ====
Eusebius commented as follows:

The error of the Manichees, which commenced at this time.

— In the mean time, also, that madman Manes, (Mani is of Persian or Semitic origin) as he was called, well agreeing with his name, for his demoniacal heresy, armed himself by the perversion of his reason, and at the instruction of Satan, to the destruction of many. He was a barbarian in his life, both in speech and conduct, but in his nature as one possessed and insane. Accordingly, he attempted to form himself into a Christ, and then also proclaimed himself to be the very paraclete and the Holy Spirit, and with all this was greatly puffed up with his madness. Then, as if he were Christ, he selected twelve disciples, the partners of his new religion, and after patching together false and ungodly doctrines, collected from a thousand heresies long since extinct, he swept them off like a deadly poison, from Persia, upon this part of the world. Hence the impious name of the Manichaeans spreading among many, even to the present day. Such then was the occasion of this knowledge, as it was falsely called, that sprouted up in these times.

==== Acta Archelai ====
An example of how inaccurate some of these accounts could be can be seen in the account of the origins of Manichaeism contained in the Acta Archelai. This was a Greek anti-Manichaean work written before 348, most well known in its Latin version, which was regarded as an accurate account of Manichaeism until refuted by Isaac de Beausobre in the 18th century:

In the time of the Apostles there lived a man named Scythianus, who is described as coming "from Scythia", and also as being "a Saracen by race" ("ex genere Saracenorum"). He settled in Egypt, where he became acquainted with "the wisdom of the Egyptians", and invented the religious system that was afterwards known as Manichaeism. Finally he emigrated to Palestine, and, when he died, his writings passed into the hands of his sole disciple, a certain Terebinthus. The latter betook himself to Babylonia, assumed the name of Budda, and endeavoured to propagate his master's teaching. But he, like Scythianus, gained only one disciple, who was an old woman. After a while he died, in consequence of a fall from the roof of a house, and the books that he had inherited from Scythianus became the property of the old woman, who, on her death, bequeathed them to a young man named Corbicius, who had been her slave. Corbicius thereupon changed his name to Manes, studied the writings of Scythianus, and began to teach the doctrines that they contained, with many additions of his own. He gained three disciples, named Thomas, Addas, and Hermas. About this time the son of the Persian king fell ill, and Manes undertook to cure him; the prince, however, died, whereupon Manes was thrown into prison. He succeeded in escaping, but eventually fell into the hands of the king, by whose order he was flayed, and his corpse was hung up at the city gate.

A. A. Bevan, who quoted this story, commented that it "has no claim to be considered historical".

==== View of Judaism in the Acta Archelai ====
According to Hegemonius' portrayal of Mani, the evil demiurge who created the world was the Jewish Yahweh. Hegemonius reports that Mani said,

"It is the Prince of Darkness who spoke with Moses, the Jews and their priests. Thus the Christians, the Jews, and the Pagans are involved in the same error when they worship this God. For he leads them astray in the lusts he taught them." He goes on to state: "Now, he who spoke with Moses, the Jews, and the priests he says is the archont of Darkness, and the Christians, Jews, and pagans (ethnic) are one and the same, as they revere the same god. For in his aspirations he seduces them, as he is not the god of truth. And so therefore all those who put their hope in the god who spoke with Moses and the prophets have (this in store for themselves, namely) to be bound with him, because they did not put their hope in the god of truth. For that one spoke with them (only) according to their own aspirations.

=== Central Asian and Iranian primary sources ===
In the early 1900s, original Manichaean writings started to come to light when German scholars led by Albert Grünwedel, and then by Albert von Le Coq, began excavating at Gaochang, the ancient site of the Manichaean Uyghur Kingdom near Turpan, in Chinese Turkestan (destroyed around 1300 CE). While most of the writings they uncovered were in very poor condition, there were still hundreds of pages of Manichaean scriptures, written in three Iranian languages (Middle Persian, Parthian, and Sogdian) and old Uyghur. These writings were taken back to Germany and were analyzed and published at the Prussian Academy of Sciences in Berlin, by Le Coq and others, such as Friedrich W. K. Müller and Walter Bruno Henning. While the vast majority of these writings were written in a version of the Syriac script known as Manichaean script, the German researchers, perhaps for lack of suitable fonts, published most of them using the Hebrew alphabet (which could easily be substituted for the 22 Syriac letters).

Perhaps the most comprehensive of these publications was Manichaeische Dogmatik aus chinesischen und iranischen Texten (Manichaean Dogma from Chinese and Iranian texts), by Ernst Waldschmidt and Wolfgang Lentz, published in Berlin in 1933. More than any other research work published before or since, this work printed, and then discussed, the original key Manichaean texts in the original scripts, and consists chiefly of sections from Chinese texts, and Middle Persian and Parthian texts transcribed with the Hebrew alphabet. After the Nazi Party gained power in Germany, the Manichaean writings continued to be published during the 1930s, but the publishers no longer used Hebrew letters, instead transliterating the texts into Latin letters.

=== Coptic primary sources ===
Additionally, in 1930, German researchers in Egypt found a large body of Manichaean works in Coptic. Though these were also damaged, hundreds of complete pages survived and, beginning in 1933, were analyzed and published in Berlin before World War II, by German scholars such as Hans Jakob Polotsky. Some of these Coptic Manichaean writings were lost during the war.

=== Chinese primary sources ===
After the success of the German researchers, French scholars visited China and discovered what is perhaps the most complete set of Manichaean writings, written in Chinese. These three Chinese writings, all found at the Mogao Caves among the Dunhuang manuscripts, and all written before the 9th century, are today kept in London, Paris, and Beijing. Some of the scholars involved with their initial discovery and publication were Édouard Chavannes, Paul Pelliot, and Aurel Stein. The original studies and analyses of these writings, along with their translations, first appeared in French, English, and German, before and after World War II. The complete Chinese texts themselves were first published in Tokyo, Japan in 1927, in the Taishō Tripiṭaka, volume 54. While in the last thirty years or so they have been republished in both Germany (with a complete translation into German, alongside the 1927 Japanese edition), and China, the Japanese publication remains the standard reference for the Chinese texts.

=== Greek life of Mani, Cologne codex ===
In Egypt, a small codex was found and became known through antique dealers in Cairo. It was purchased by the University of Cologne in 1969. Two of its scientists, Henrichs and Koenen, produced the first edition known since as the Cologne Mani-Codex, which was published in four articles in the Zeitschrift für Papyrologie und Epigraphik. The ancient papyrus manuscript contained a Greek text describing the life of Mani. Thanks to this discovery, much more is known about the man who founded one of the most influential world religions of the past.

== Figurative use ==
The terms "Manichaean" and "Manichaeism" are sometimes used figuratively as a synonym of the more general term "dualist" with respect to a philosophy, outlook, or world-view. The terms are often used to suggest that the worldview in question simplistically reduces historical events to a struggle between good and evil. For example, Zbigniew Brzezinski used the phrase "Manichaean paranoia" in reference to U.S. president George W. Bush's worldview (in The Daily Show with Jon Stewart, 14 March 2007); Brzezinski elaborated that he meant "the notion that he [Bush] is leading the forces of good against the 'Axis of evil.'" Author and journalist Glenn Greenwald followed up on the theme in describing Bush in his book A Tragic Legacy (2007).

The term is frequently used by critics to describe the attitudes and foreign policies of the United States and its leaders.

Philosopher Frantz Fanon frequently invoked the concept of Manicheanism in his discussions of violence between colonizers and the colonized.

In My Secret History, author Paul Theroux's protagonist defines the word Manichaean for the protagonist's son as "seeing that good and evil are mingled." Before explaining the word to his son, the protagonist mentions Joseph Conrad's short story "The Secret Sharer" at least twice in the book, the plot of which also examines the idea of the duality of good and evil.

Historian Barbara Alice Mann used the term to describe Hewitt's constructed good and evil dichotomy between orenda and otkon. She argues that Uki (in her view, a synonym for orenda) is a complementary twin to otkon, mirrored in the story of the twins in Haudenosaunee mythology and thus not actually manichaean.

== See also ==
- Manichaean art
- Athinganoi, a purportedly related movement
- Abū Hilāl al-Dayhūri (8th century)
- Agapius (Manichaean) (4th or 5th century)
- Akouas
- Ancient Mesopotamian religion
- The Buddha in Manichaeism
- Chinese Manichaeism
- Good and evil
- Dualism in cosmology
- Hiwi al-Balkhi
- Indo-Iranian religion
- Jesus in Manichaeism
- Mar Ammo (3rd century)
- Mazdak
- Ming Cult
- Moral realism
- Abu Isa al-Warraq
- Yazdânism
- Yazidi
- Zurvanism
