= Faustus of Mileve =

Fourth-century Manichaean bishop

Faustus of Mileve was a Manichaean bishop of the fourth century. He is now remembered for his encounter with Augustine of Hippo, in Carthage around 383. He was from Milevis, Numidia (modern Algeria). From a poor, pagan background, he had become a highly reputed teacher, preacher and debater.

As described in the Confessions, Augustine first learned of Faustus shortly after joining the Manichaean faith. The bishop was widely regarded as the most learned member of the sect in the region, and many of the more difficult questions which the newly converted Augustine put to his teachers were deferred to his arrival in Carthage: "for all the other members of the sect that I happened to meet, when they were unable to answer the questions I raised, always referred me to his coming. They promised that, in discussion with him, these and even greater difficulties, if I had them, would be quite easily and amply cleared away."

When Faustus finally arrives in Carthage, Augustine describes him as pleasant in character and very well-spoken, but inadequate to the task of defending Manichaean theology; indeed, Augustine says that his true talents lay in eloquently evading difficult questions. Augustine writes disparagingly that "I discovered at once that he knew nothing of the liberal arts except grammar, and that only in an ordinary way. He had, however, read some of Tully’s orations, a very few books of Seneca, and some of the poets, and such few books of his own sect as were written in good Latin. With this meager learning and his daily practice in speaking, he had acquired a sort of eloquence which proved the more delightful and enticing because it was under the direction of a ready wit and a sort of native grace."

In 386, Faustus was exiled with the rest of the Manichaeans, but this decree was revoked in January 387 by Theodosius I and Arcadius. Faustus died before 400, since Augustine of Hippo's treatise, Contra Faustum, speaks of him in the past tense.

== Sources ==
- Augustine (2008). Bourke, Vernon J. (ed.). Confessions. Catholic University of America Press.
- Gardner, Iain; Lieu, Samuel N. C., eds. (2004). Manichaean Texts from the Roman Empire. Cambridge University Press.
- Tardieu, Michel (2008). Manichaeism. University of Illinois Press.
