= Fundamental Epistle =

The Fundamental Epistle or Letter of Foundation (Latin: Epistola Fundamenti) was one of the sacred writings of the Manichaean religion, written by the founder Mani (c. 216–276 CE), originally in Syriac. According to religious scholar Timothy Pettipiece, "the exact nature of this writing's relationship with the Manichaean canon remains ambiguous". Since none of the original Syriac writings of Manichaeism remain, only translations of small sections of this book, made by either Manichaeans or anti-Manichaeans, are extant. One of the most well-known references to this book is found in the writings of Saint Augustine (354–430 CE), who, before converting to Christianity, was a Manichaean "hearer" for a number of years. In two of his anti-Manichaean books, he quotes a few paragraphs of the Fundamental Epistle.
