= Archegos (Manichaeism) =

Historical head of the Manichaean religion

The Archegos (A Koine Greek calque of a native Syriac, Middle Persian, or Parthian language term) was the head of the Manichaean religion. No surviving list of every Archegos remains, and the succession procedure is unknown. Abū Hilāl al-Dayhūri is the last known Archegos. The first Archegos was the prophet Mani.

== List of known archegoi ==
- Mani
- Mar Sisin (276–286)
- Innaios, who negotiated the end of persecution in Mesopotamia
- Mihr
- Zad Hurmuz
- Miqlas
- Abū Hilāl al-Dayhūri

== See also ==
- Manichaean schisms
