= Akouas =

Manichaean leader

Akouas (or Acuas) was an important figure in early Manichaeism. He has been identified with another Manichaean figure from Iranian sources named Mar Zaku.

== Identity ==
Akouas was an early disciple of Mani, and was sent by him to preach in the Western Sassanid Empire. Epiphanius of Salamis reported that Akouas was a military veteran ("veteranus"), leading Samuel N. C. Lieu to suggest he may have been a Roman prisoner of war who discovered Manichaeism during his "enforced stay" in the Sassanid Empire.

== Significance ==
Epiphanius of Salamis stated that Akouas was the first to bring Manichaeism to his hometown of Eleutheropolis in Palestine. He stated that Manichaeans there were known as "Akouanitans" (or "Acuanites") due to his influence. John of Damascus later described Manichaeans as being referred to as "Aconites."

Epiphanius dates Akouas' preaching in Eleutheropolis to the reign of Aurelian (273–274). According to Samuel N. C. Lieu, this places Akouas "among Mani's second generation of disciples whom Mani sent to consolidate the work of Adda and Patik" in Rome's eastern provinces.

== See also ==
- Mar Ammo
