= Susan Whitfield =

British scholar

Susan Whitfield (born 1960) is a British scholar, currently Professor in Silk Road Studies at the Sainsbury Institute for the Study of Japanese Arts and Cultures (SISJAC), University of East Anglia. She previously worked at the British Library in London, England. She specialises in the history and archaeology of the Silk Road but has also written on human rights and censorship in China.

== Career ==
Whitfield obtained a PhD in historiography from SOAS, University of London in 1995, with a dissertation entitled Politics against the Pen on the Tang dynasty poet Liu Zongyuan.

Whitfield was the first director of the International Dunhuang Project, a position which she held for 24 years, from 1993 until July 2017. In this capacity she was involved in research and cataloguing of Central Asian manuscripts at the British Library and elsewhere. She has a particular interest in censorship and forgeries from Dunhuang. In an interview at the University of Minnesota in 2013, she talks about how she came to her interest in China and Central Asia and ways in which her interest in Central Asia has made her rethink Chinese history, regarding it as rather more fragmented and diverse than unitary narratives might have us believe.

Whitfield holds a position as Honorary Associate Professor at the Institute of Archaeology of University College London.

== Books ==
- Zou Zongxu (1991) [1987]. The Land Within the Passes: A History of Xian. Translated by Susan Whitfield. Viking. ISBN 0-670-82391-0.
- Whitfield, Roderick; Whitfield, Susan; Agnew, Neville (2000). Cave temples of Dunhuang: art and history on the silk road. British Library. ISBN 9780712346979.
- Whitfield, Susan (2001). After the Event: Human Rights and Their Future in China. Wellsweep Press. ISBN 978-0-9484-5418-9.
- Whitfield, Susan (2002). Dunhuang Manuscript Forgeries. British Library. ISBN 978-0-7123-4631-3.
- Whitfield, Susan (2004). Aurel Stein on the Silk Road. British Museum. ISBN 978-0-7141-2416-2.
- Whitfield, Susan (2004). The Silk Road: Trade, Travel, War and Faith. Serindia Publications, Inc. ISBN 978-1-932476-13-2.
- Whitfield, Susan (2015). Life along the Silk Road. University of California Press. ISBN 978-0-520-96029-9.
- Whitfield, Susan (2018). Silk, Slaves and Stupas - Material Culture of the Silk Road. University of California Press. ISBN 978-0-520-28178-3.
- Whitfield, Susan (ed.) (2019). Silk Roads. Peoples, Cultures, Landscapes. Thames and Hudson. ISBN 978-0500021576
