= Index of religion-related articles =

Alphabetical listing of religion related topics

This is an index page of Wikipedia articles related to the topic of religion.

Many Wikipedia articles on religious topics are not yet listed on this page. If you cannot find the topic you are interested in on this page, it still may already exist; you can try to find it using the "Search" box. If you find that it exists, you can edit this page to add a link to it.

If you click on "Related changes" at the side of this page, you will see a list of the most recent changes in articles to which this page links. (This page links to itself and its talk page so that changes to them can be tracked by the same means.)

== 0–9 ==
1644 Baptist Confession of Faith - 1689 Baptist Confession of Faith

== A ==
Abatur - Abel - Abiku - Abolitionism - Abraham - Abrahamic religions - Accommodation - Acolyte - Acts of Pilate - Acts of Thomas - Adam - Adam Kadmon - Adam kasia - Adam pagria - Adam and Eve - Aeon - Agnosticism - Agnostic Theism - Ahmadiyya - Ahn Shi Il - Aion - Akhenaton - Alawites - Alexandrian Rite - Alpha course - Altar - Altar rail - Altar server - Amaterasu Amazing Grace - Ambarvalia - Amish - Amitābha - Anabaptist - Anathema - Anatta - Ancient of Days - Ancient Greek religion - Ancient Egyptian religion Angel - Anglican Communion - Anglicanism - Anglo-Catholicism - Animism - Anointing - Anointing of the sick - Antediluvian - Anthropology of religion - Antichrist - Apatheism - Apocrypha - Apocatastasis - Apostle - Apostles' Creed - Apostolic Pardon - Apostolic See - Apostolic succession - Ara Pacis - Aram, son of Shem - Aranyaka - Arathi - Archbishop - Archon (Gnosticism) - Ardhanarishvara - Arguments against the existence of God - Arguments for the existence of God - Arhat - Arianism - Arminianism - Arul Nool - Arzhang - Ásatrú - Ascension of Jesus Christ - Asceticism - Ash Wednesday - Asherah - Aṣẹ - Asmodai - Assumption of Mary - Astrology - Aten - Athanasian Creed - Atharvaveda - Atheism - Atonement - Augur - Augustinians - Auspice - Autocephaly - Avatar - Awards - Ayyavazhi - Ayyavazhi mythology - Azazel - Aztec mythology

== B ==
Baal teshuva - Baal - Báb - Bábism - Babylonian calendar - Baháʼí calendar - Baháʼí Faith - Bahá'u'lláh - Bakkah - Balaam - Balarama - Balor - Bantu religion - Baptism - Baptism for the dead - Baptism of the Holy Spirit - Baptistery - Bar mitzvah and Bat mitzvah - Beatific vision - Beast - Beelzebub - Robert Bellarmine - Benedictine - Bhagavata Purana - Bhakti - Bhakti movement - Bible - The Bible and history - Bible translations - Biblical canon - Biblical inerrancy - Biblical maximalism - Biblical poetry - Biblical Sabbath - Binding of Isaac - Bioethics - Bishops' Bible - Bishop - Black Madonna - Blessed Sacrament - Blessed Virgin Mary - Blood libel - B'nai Noach - Bodhisattva - Bodhi - Bogomilism - Book of Enoch - The Book of Giants - Mandaean Book of John - Book of Mormon - Book of Mysteries - Books of the Bible - Born again - Brahma - Brahman - Brahmana - Brahmin - Brahma Kumaris - Brethren of the Common Life - Breviary - Brit milah - Buddha-nature - Buddhahood - Buddhism -

== C ==
Thomas Cajetan - Canadian Unitarian Council - Calendar of saints - Calvinism - Cambridge Declaration - Candomblé - Canon (priest) - Canon law - Canons of Dort - Cantor (church) - Cardinal (Catholicism) - Carmelites - Carmen Saliare - Catechism - Catechism of the Catholic Church - Catharism - Cathedral - Cathedral architecture - Catholic Apostolic Church - Catholic Church - Catholic Church against war on Iraq - Catholic Communion - Catholic King - Catholic ministers - Sacraments (Catholic Church) - Catholicism - Celibacy - Chalcedonian Creed - Charismatic - Chayot - Cherub - Chicago Statement on Biblical Inerrancy - Child sacrifice - Chinese house church - Chosen people - Chrismation - Christian anti-Semitism - Christian anarchism - Christian eschatology - Christian fundamentalism - Christian–Jewish reconciliation - Christian Identity - Christian mythology - Christian Peacemaker Teams - Christian Science - Christian theological controversy - Christian theosophy - Christian tradition - Christianity - Christianity and Judaism - Christmas - Christmas Eve - Christology - Church - Church planting - Ciiɗ (Serer religion) - Circumcision - Civil religion - Clergy - Clerical celibacy - Closed communion - College of Cardinals - College of Pontiffs - Communion of Saints - Comparative religion - Concordat - Conditional baptism - Confession (religion) - Confirmation (sacrament) - Confucianism - Congregation of Christian Brothers - Congregationalism - Congregationalist polity - Consecration - Conservative Judaism - Continuous revelation - Conversational intolerance - Cosmology - Counter-Reformation - A Course In Miracles - Covenant (religion) - Covenanters - Covenant theology - Creationism - Creed - Criticism of religion - Crucifixion - Crusade - Crypto-Judaism - Crypto-Christianity - Cult - Cult (religion) - Curse

== D ==
Dabru Emet - Dajjal - Day of the Vow - Deacon - Dead Sea Scrolls - Death or departure of the gods Deism - Deity - Demigod - Demiurge - Demonology - Demon - Deuterocanonical books - Deuteronomy - Devaki - Devil - Devil's Advocate - Dharma - Dhimmi - Dies Irae - Diocese - Discordianism - Dispensationalism - Divination - Divine grace - Divine healing - Divine Liturgy - Divine providence - Divine simplicity - Doctor of the Church - Doctrine Doctrine - Doctrine and Covenants - Documentary hypothesis - Dogmatic definition - Dogma - Dominican Order - Dominus Iesus - Douai Bible - Drabsha - Druidry - Druze - Dualism in cosmology - Durga

== E ==
Early Christianity - Early Muslim philosophy - Earth religion - East Asian religions East–West Schism - Easter - Eastern Christianity - Eastern Orthodox Church - Eastern Orthodoxy - Eastern Catholic Churches - Ecclesia (sociology of religion) - Ecclesial communities contrasted - Ecclesiology - Eckankar - Economics of religion - Economy (Eastern Orthodoxy) - Ecumenical - Ecumenical council - Ecumenism - Mary Baker Eddy - Egyptian mythology - El (deity) - El Shaddai - Elcesaites - Elohim - Emanationism - Emergency baptism - Emerging Church - Enoch - Enos - Epiclesis - Epiphany (feast) - Episcopacy -- Episcopal Church in Jerusalem and the Middle East - Episcopal see - Eritrean Orthodox Church - Esbat - Eschatology - Essenes - Espiritismo - Ethnic religion - Eucharist - Evangelicalism - Evolution - Ex cathedra - Excommunication - Book of Exodus - Exorcism - Expository preaching - Extra Ecclesiam Nulla Salus

== F ==
Father of Greatness - Faith - Fall of man - Fallen angel - Feast of the Lemures - Fetishism - Fideism - Filioque clause - First Vatican Council - Five Pillars of Islam - Five solas - Fleur de lys - Flirty Fishing - Flying Spaghetti Monster - Folk religion - Fratres Arvales - Free Church of Scotland - Full communion - Full Gospel - Fundamental Epistle - Fundamentalism - Funeral

== G ==
Gabriel - Ganesha - Ganzibra - Gautama Buddha - Genesis - Geneva Bible - Gender of God - Gersonides - Ginza Rabba - Glossolalia - Gnosticism - God - Goddess - Goddess movement - Gog and Magog - The Golden Bough - Gospel of John - Gospel of Luke - Gospel of Mani - Gospel of Mark - Gospel of Matthew - Gospel of Thomas - Great Apostasy - Great Bible - Greek mythology - Greek Orthodox Church - Greek religion - Gregorian calendar - Gregorian chant - Guru

== H ==
Hagiography - Hail Mary - Haitian Vodou - Halakha - Hanuman - Haran Gawaita - Haredi Judaism - Harihara - Harran - Harrowing of Hell - Haruspex - Hasidim - Hasidism - Hayyi Rabbi - Heaven - Hebrew Bible - Hebrew calendar - Hebrew - Hell - Hellenistic religion - Henotheism - Herem (censure) - Herem (priestly gift) - Herem (war or property) - Heresy - Hermeticism - Hermoea - Heterodoxy - High Sabbaths - Hinduism - Hiram Abiff - Historical episcopate - History of ancient Israel and Judah - History of Buddhism - History of Christianity - History of Islam - History of Hinduism - History of Jainism - Holocaust theology - Holy card - Holy Day of Obligation - Holy Living and Holy Dying - Holy Orders - Holy Prepuce - Holy See - Holy Spirit - Holy Synod - Holy water - Homeric hymns - House church - Human sacrifice - Hymn - Hyper-Calvinism

== I ==
Icon - Iconoclasm - Iconostasis - Idolatry - Ifá - Iguvine Tables - Imam - Impiety - Imperial cult - Incarnation - Indulgence - Indian religions - Infidel - Inquisition - Institute of the Brothers of the Christian Schools - Integral theory (Ken Wilber) - Intelligent design - Intercommunion - Involution (esotericism) - Irreligion - Irresistible grace - Isaac - Isaiah - Ishta-Deva - Ishmael - Ishvara - Islam - Islam and anti-Semitism - Islam and Judaism - Islamic calendar - Islamic view of Jesus - Islamism - Isma'ilism -

== J ==
Jacob - Jainism - James the Just - Jehovah's Witnesses - Jehovah's Witnesses and the Holocaust - Jerusalem - Jesus - Jewish eschatology - Jewish fundamentalism - Jewish history timeline - Jewish holidays - Jewish principles of faith - Jewish services - Jewish views on marriage - Jewish views on religious pluralism - Jews for Jesus - Jihad - Jinn - John the Baptist - Jordan River - Jubilee (Biblical) - Jubilee (Christian) - Judaism - Jumu'ah - Justification (theology)

== K ==
Kabbalah - Kagura - Kairos - Kairos retreat - Kali - Kalûnga Line - Kami - Kardecist spiritism - Karaite Judaism - Karma - Kartikeya - Kashrut - Kenosis - King James Version - King-James-Only Movement - Klila - Kohen - Kokh Kox - Kollel - Kongo cosmogram - Kongo religion - Korban - Krishna - Krishnaism - Krun

== L ==
Laity - Lakshmi - Land of Israel - Last Judgment - Latin Church - Latin liturgical rites - Latria - Latrocinium - Latter Rain Movement - Laufa - Lay presidency - Leviathan - Leviticus - Light Upon Light - Lilith - Liminality - Liminal deity - Limited atonement - Liturgical colours - Liturgical hymn - Liturgical Year - Liturgy - Louisiana Voodoo - Lucifer - Luciferianism - Lupercalia - Lutheranism

== M ==
Magic (supernatural) - Magic and religion - Magnificat - Magus - Mahabharata - Mahayana - Maimonides - Maitreya - Major orders - Manda d-Hayyi - Mandaeans - Mandaeism - Mandi (Mandaeism) - Mani (prophet) - Manichaeism - Marcionism - Mari religion Mariamman - Marian apparitions - Maronite - Mary, mother of Jesus - Mary Magdalene - Masbuta - Masiqta - Masoretic Text - Mass (liturgy) - Mass (music) - Massacre of the Innocents - Matarta - Maya Hero Twins - Maya religion - Cotton Mather - Increase Mather - Meditation - Meforshim - Megachurch - Mephistopheles - Merkabah - Messiah - Messianic Judaism - Methodism - Metrical psalter - Metropolitan bishop - Michael (archangel) - Midrash - Mikvah - Millennialism - Millerism - Minor orders - Minority religion - Miracle - Miriai - Miriam - Mishnah - Misogi Mithraism - Mitzvah - Modern Orthodox Judaism - Modern paganism - Moloch - Monad (Gnosticism) - Monastery - Monasticism - Monism - Monk - Monophysitism - Monotheism - Moravian Church - Moriah - Mormonism - Edgardo Mortara - Moses - Mosque - Mourning - Muhammad - Mun (religion) - Mussar Movement - Mysticism -

== N ==
Nanda (Hinduism) - Nasheed - Nagual Natural theology - Nazarene (sect) - Neo-druidism - Neoplatonism - Neoplatonism Christian - Nestorianism - New Age - New moon - New Testament - Nganga Nicene Creed - Nirvana - Nirvana in Buddhism - Noah - Nontheistic religions - Nontrinitarianism - Norse mythology - Numinous - Number of the beast Nzambi Ampungu

== O ==
Oahspe: A New Bible - Occult - Old English Bible translations - Old Testament - Ọlọrun - Om - Omen - Omnipotence - Omniscience - Order of the Solar Temple - Organizational structure of Jehovah's Witnesses - Oriental Orthodoxy - Original sin - Orisha - Orthodoxy - Orthodox Baháʼí Faith - Orthodox Christian Mission Center - Orthodox Judaism

== P ==
Paganism - Pali canon - Pali - Panentheism - Pange Lingua - Pantheism - Papal abdication - Papal bull - Papal coronation - Papal election - Papal infallibility - Papal States - Papal tiara - Paradise - Parentalia - Paraclete - Parousia - Particular church - Parvati - Parwanaya - Passover - Patriarch - Patron saint - Paul of Tarsus - Paulicianism - Pauline Christianity - Pearl of Great Price - Pelagianism - Pentateuch - Pentecostalism - People of the Book - Permanent deacon - Perpetual virginity of Mary - Persecution of Christians - Persian religions - Peter - Pharisee - Philistine - Philosophy of religion - Phronema - Pietism - Pilgrim's Progress - Pilgrimage - Pleroma - Plural Marriage (Mormonism) - Political religion - Polytheism - Polytheistic reconstructionism - Pontiff - Pontifex Maximus - Pope - Popol Vuh - Posek - Pow-wow (folk magic) - Practices of Jehovah's Witnesses - Pradyumna - Pragmateia - Prakrit - Prayer - Prayer for the dead - Prayer wheel - Predestination - Pre-existence - Presbyterian - Presbyterian Church - Presbytery (sacred architecture) - Prevenient grace - Priesthood (Mormonism) - Priesthood of all believers - Priest - Primacy of the Roman Pontiff - Primate (bishop) - Prince of Darkness (Manichaeism) - Probabilism - Problem of evil - Problem of Hell - Process theology - Projects working for peace among Israelis and Arabs - Prophet - Prophets of Islam - Protestantism - Protestant Reformation - Proto-Indo-European religion - Psalm - Psalms of Asaph - Psalms of Thomas - Pseudoscience - Psilanthropism - Ptahil - Purgatory - Purim - Puritan - Purusha -

== Q ==
Qibla - Qulasta - Quietism (Christian philosophy) - Qur'an

== R ==
Rabbi - Rabbinical Assembly - Rabbinic literature - Radha - Raëlism - Raja Yoga - Rama - Ramadan - Raphael (angel) - Rasta - Rastafari movement - Rationalism - Reader (liturgy) - Rebbe - Reconstructionist Judaism - Reform Judaism - Reincarnation - Religion - Religion and abortion - Religion and homosexuality - Religion in Ancient Greece - Religion in Canada - Religion in Germany - Religion in India - Religion in pre-Islamic Arabia - Religion in the United States - Religious aspects of marriage - Religious conversion - Religious cosmology - Religious denomination - Religious ecstasy - Religious humanism - Religious intolerance - Religious persecution - Religious pluralism - Religious studies - Repentance - Requiem - Responsa - Restorationism - Restoration (Mormonism) - Resurrection - Resurrection of Jesus - Revelation - Reverence - Rhema - RHEMA Bible Training Center - Righteousness - Rigveda - Rishama - Ritual purification - Ritual washing in Judaism - Roman Catholic Church sex abuse allegations - Romanian Orthodox Church - Roman mythology - Roog Rosh Hashanah - Ruha

== S ==
Sabbath - Sabbath in Christianity - Sabbath in seventh-day churches - Sabbath School - Sabellianism - Sabians - Sacrament - Sacramental bread - Sacramental character - Sacramental index - Sacred - Sacred Heart - Sacred king - Sacred language - Sacred text - Sacred Tradition - Sacrifice - Sadducee - Samhita - Saraswati - Sai Baba - Saint - Saints, calendar of - Salvation - Samael - Samaritanism - Samaritans - Samba (Krishna's son) - Samaveda - Sanctification - Sanskrit - Santería - Sarah - Satanism - Satan - Sathya Sai Baba - Saturday - Saturnalia - Scapegoat - Scientology Talk:Scientology - Scofield Reference Bible - Seal of the Prophets - Second Coming - Second Great Awakening - Second Vatican Council - Secondary conversion - Sect - Secular humanism - Seder - Sede vacante - Sedevacantism - Sephardic Judaism - Sephardi - Septuagint - Seraph - Serer religion - Sermon - Sermon on the Mount - Seth - Shabbat - Shabbat (Talmud) - Shabbaton - Shabbos goy - Shabuhragan - Shaivism - Shakti - Shaktism - Shamanism - Shappatum - Sharia - Shavuot - Shem - Shia Islam - Shinto - Shirk (Islam) - Shishlam - Shiva - Shmita - Shofar - Shrine - Shrines to Mary, mother of Jesus - Shugendō - Shunning - Siddur - Sikhism - Sikhs - Sign of the cross - Signs and Wonders - Simony - Sin - Sira - Sita - Skeptical theism - Sky father - Sky deity - Slain in the Spirit - Smarta tradition - Smith, Joseph, Jr. - Socinianism - Sodom and Gomorrah - Sol Invictus - Solar deity - Sophia (Gnosticism) - Soul - Soul sleep - Spirit (animating force) - Spirit (supernatural entity) Spiritual mapping - Spiritual (music) - Spirit possession - Spiritual warfare - Spiritualism (beliefs) - Spiritualism (movement) - Spirituality - State religion - Stations of the Cross - Subhadra - Suburbicarian diocese - Succubus - Sufism - Suitheism - Sukkot - Sumerian religion - Sunnah - Sunni Islam - Supernatural - Supersessionism - Superstition - Supreme Pontiff - Surat Shabd Yoga - Sutra - Svayam Bhagavan - Syllabus of Errors - Synagogue - Syncretism

== T ==
Tabernacle - Taga - Tathagatagarbha doctrine - Tallit - Talmud - Tanakh - Taoism - Tarmida - Tawhid - Tefillin - Temple - Temple (Latter Day Saints) - Temple in Jerusalem - Temple menorah - Ten Commandments - The Ten Gurus of Sikhism - Territorial spirit - Tetragrammaton - Thai lunar calendar - Thealogy - Theism - Theodicy - Theology - Theoria - Theosis (Eastern Christian theology) - Theosophy - Theravada - Third Wave of the Holy Spirit - Thirty-Nine Articles - Three-Chapter Controversy - Three Wise Men - Tibetan Buddhism - Tipitaka - Torah study - Torah - Tosefta - Total depravity - Totem - Toward the Light - Tract (liturgy) - Transcendentalism - Transfiguration - Transubstantiation - Translation (religion) - Treasure of Life - Trimurti - Trinitarian formula - Trinity - Tripitaka - Tutelary deity

== U ==
Umbanda - Unitarianism - Unitarian Universalism - Unitarian Universalist Association - United Synagogue of Conservative Judaism - Universalism - Universi Dominici gregis - Upanishad - Uposatha - Ur - The Urantia Book - Uriel - Uthra -

== V ==
Vaishnavism - Vajrayana - Valentinianism - The Varieties of Religious Experience - Vajrayana - Vasudeva - Vatican Hill - Vegetarianism and religion - Vegetation deity Veneration - Veneration of the dead - Vespers - Vetus Latina - Veve Vibhuti - Vindhyavasini - Vineyard Movement - Viruses of the Mind - Vishnu - Volcano deity - Vulgate

== W ==
Wahhabi - Wali - Week - Charles Wesley - John Wesley - West African Vodún - Western Rite Orthodoxy - Western Schism - Western Wall - Westminster Confession of Faith - Westminster Larger Catechism - Westminster Shorter Catechism - Wheel of the Year - Ellen G. White - The White Goddess - Whore of Babylon - Wicca - Roger Williams - John Wimber - Witches' Sabbath - Witch of Endor - Women - Word of Knowledge - World of Darkness - World of Light - Worship - Worship dance - Wudu

== X ==
Xian (Taoism) - Xiuhtecuhtli - Xolotl - Xooy - Xmas

== Y ==
Yajurveda - Yahweh - Yarsanism - Yashoda - Yazdânism - Yazidis - Yazidism - Yeshiva University - Yeshiva - Yeshu - Yeshua (name) - Yom Kippur - Yoruba mythology - Yopaat Brigham Young - Yushamin

== Z ==
Zen - Zionism - Zohar - Zoroaster - Zoroastrianism - Zurvanism

== Lists ==
- 613 commandments
- List of Ayyavazhi-related articles
- List of Ayyavazhi organisations
- List of Bible stories
- List of Biblical names
- List of Buddhist topics
- List of Cathedrals
- List of Catholic priests
- List of Christian denominations
- List of Christian Universalists
- Lists of deities
- List of death deities -
- List of Di Indigetes
- List of founders of religious traditions
- List of Greek mythological characters
- List of Germanic deities -
- List of Greek deities -
- List of Hinduism-related articles
- List of hymnals
- List of Islamic terms in Arabic
- List of Jain topics
- List of Jains
- List of Jain temples
- List of Japanese deities
- List of Messianic Jewish organizations
- List of monasteries dissolved by Henry VIII of England
- List of Muslims
- List of names for the biblical nameless
- List of Patriarchs of Antioch
- List of Patriarchs of Constantinople
- List of people by belief
- List of popes
- List of religions and spiritual traditions
- List of religious organizations
- List of saints
- List of spirituality-related topics
- List of sutras
- List of theological demons
- List of Unitarians, Universalists, and Unitarian Universalists
- List of Unitarian, Universalist, and Unitarian Universalist churches
- Buddhist terms and concepts
- Depiction of Jesus
- Methods of divination
- Names of God
- Names of God in Christianity
- Names of God in Islam
- Names of God in Judaism
- Unitarian martyrs
