= Manichaean scripture =

Religious texts of Manichaeism

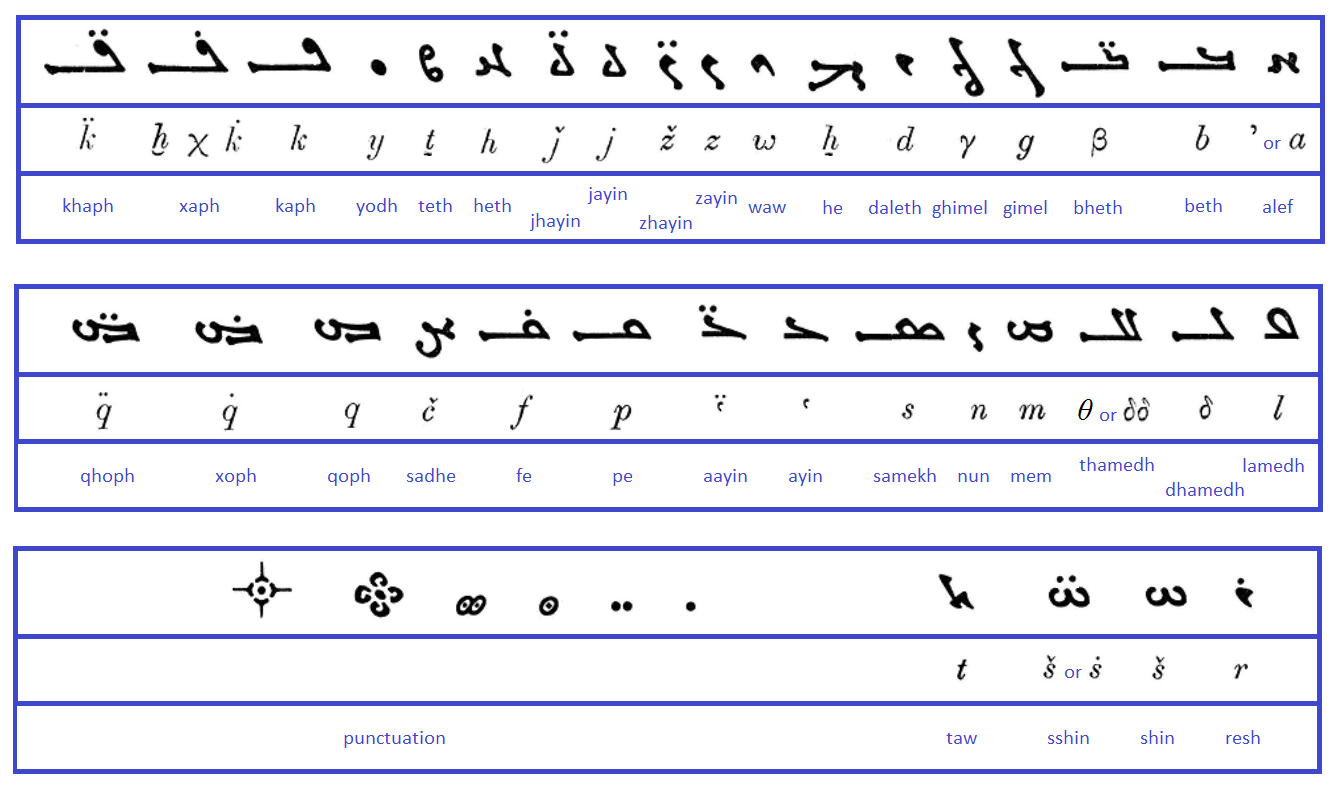
Manichean characters

Manichaean scripture includes nine main books: the Seven Treatises of Manichaeism, all personally written by Mani in Syriac, the Shabuhragan written by Mani in Middle Persian, and the Arzhang, a series of illustrations painted by Mani.

The Kephalaia are not scriptural but rather a secondary literature on Manichaeism commenting on the scripture.

== Seven Treatises ==
Seven Treatises of Manichaeism, sometimes also referred to as the Manichaean Heptateuch, are seven scriptures personally written by the founder of Manichaeism, Mani.

Recognizing the shortcomings of the religions that preceded him, Mani was determined to create a world, unified religion. In Mani's view, the unity of religious thought in the past could only be achieved when the founders were alive. However, these founders did not write books themselves, and when they died, their disciples went their own way, leading their own religions into division and confusion. Mani said of Manichaeism "The religion I have chosen is ten times greater than any previous religion. First, unlike the previous religions, which were limited to one country and one language, my religion will be popular in every country, in all languages, and spread to the ends of the earth. Secondly, previous religions existed only when they had pure leaders, and once the leaders died, their religion immediately fell into chaos and their precepts and writings were neglected. But my religion, however, thanks to its living classics, its preachers, bishops, friars, and laymen, and thanks to its wisdom and writings, will endure to the end."

1. The Gospel of Mani may have been designed as a gospel of the gnostic type, perhaps intended to comment on or replace the Christian gospel.
2. The Treasure of Life expounds Manichean views on man and the universe;
3. The Epistles contains letters from Mani and his disciples. Explain the doctrine; Discuss the correctness of Manichaeism from a perspective;
4. Psalms and Prayers contains hymns written by Mani and his disciples.
5. The Pragmateia describes the history of mankind;
6. The Book of Giants tells the story of the watcher and the giant at the beginning of the creation of the world;
7. The Book of Mysteries is grouped with the Pragmateia and the Book of Giants. It focuses on the nature of the soul using Christian apocryphal imagery

In the Manichaean Compendium these seven scriptures are compared to ships: Power, make seven of them for sailing."

For various reasons, none of the seven scriptures have been found in their entirety. Existing fragments of scriptures in Coptic, Middle Persian, Parthian, Sogdian, Uighur and other languages have been discovered, but their specific ownership needs to be further studied.

=== Name comparison ===
English name	"Keflea" 148; "Sermon 25"	Hymn 46-47; 139-40	Keflea 5	Sermons 94	Transliteration of "A Brief Introduction to Maniguang Buddhism Methods"	Paraphrase of "A Brief Introduction to Maniguang Buddhism"
Gospel of Mani	Euaggelion	Euaggelion	Euaggelion	Euaggelion	大应轮部（希腊文：evangelion）	彻尽万法根源智经
Treasure of Life	Thēsauros	Thēsauros	Thēsauros	Thēsauros	寻提贺部（粟特文：smṭyh'）	净命宝藏经
The Epistles	Epistolaue	Epistolaue	Epistolaue	Epistolaue	泥万部（中古波斯文：dēwān）	律藏经/药藏经
The Book of Mysteries	mMustērion	mMustērion	pTa tōn mustērion	mMustērion	阿罗瓒部（中古波斯文：razan）	秘密法藏经
Pragmateia	Pragmateia	Pragmateia	Pragmateia	Pragmateia	钵迦摩帝夜部（希臘文：pragmateia）	证明过去教经
The Book of Giants	nGigas	nCalashire	graphē ntlaice nnParthos	Graphe [ ntlaice nnParthos	俱缓部（中古波斯文：kawan）	大力士经
Psalms and Prayers	mPsalmos + nShlel	nShlel + 2Psalmos	mPsalmos + nShlel	nShlel	阿拂胤部（中古波斯文：āfrīn）	赞愿经

=== Controversy ===
In the Christian literature, there is another saying of the "Four Sutras of Manichae", which is not mentioned in the accounts of Manichaeism or other religions. There are many errors and it is not enough to believe. For example Kephalaia is not scriptural but rather a literary genre.

Possible identification	Hegemonius The Acts of Akilai (62.3)	Epiphanius of Salamis "Panarion" (66.2. 9)	Theodore Bar Konai "Skalia"
Book of Mysteries	Mysteria (Secret Sutra)	Musteria	Raze
Kephalaia	Capitula (Kephalaia)	Kephalaia	Rishe
Gospel of Mani	Euangelium (Gospel)	Euangelion	Ewangeliyun
Treasure of Life	Thesaurus (Treasure)	Thesauros	Simatha

== Shabuhragan ==
The Shabuhragan (Persian: شاپورگان Shāpuragān), which means "[the] book of Shapur", was a sacred book of the Manichaean religion, written by the founder Mani (c. 210–276 CE) himself, originally in Middle Persian, and dedicated to Shapur I (c. 215–272 CE), the contemporary king of the Sassanid Persian Empire. The book was designed to present to Shapur an outline of Mani's new religion, which united elements from Zoroastrianism, Christianity, and Buddhism. Original Middle Persian fragments were discovered at Turpan, and quotations were brought in Arabic by Biruni: It is the only work of Mani's not written in Syriac This book is listed as one of the seven treatises of Manichaeism in Arabic historical sources, but it is not among the seven treatises in the Manichaean account itself.

The Middle Persian word for "Shabuhragan" is "dw bwn wzrg'y š'bwhrg'n", meaning "the two sutras dedicated to Shabur "The Chinese translation is abbreviated as "two sutras". Mani wrote this book in Middle Persian and presented it to Shabur I, the king of Persia, as an outline of the teachings of Manichaeism. In this book, Mani described his religion as the perfection and continuation of other existing religions, and called himself the "Sealed Prophet": "Throughout the generations, the apostles of God have never ceased to bring wisdom and work here. Thus, they came in one age through the Apostle Buddha into the countries of India; in another, through the Apostle Zoroaster into Persia; and in another, through Jesus Christ into the West. After that, in this last age, the revelation came, which was prophesied to come to Babylon through Myself, Mani, the apostle of the true God."

== Book of Pictures ==
The Book of Pictures is an atlas illustrating the dualism of light and dark in Manichaeism. It was drawn by Mani and used to explain the doctrine to illiterate people. At this point, Mani believes that his religion is superior to the previous ones: "Indeed, all the apostles, my brothers who came before me, did not write a book. Their wisdom is just like mine. They did not paint their wisdom in the pictures like me." The importance of the Book of Pictures is second only to the Seven Treatises. In the Parthian language, this collection is also called "Ādrhang".

== See also ==
- Medinet Madi library
