= Gaetano Maria Travasa =

Italian Theatine priest, ecclesiastical historian and scholar

Reverend Gaetano Maria Travasa CR
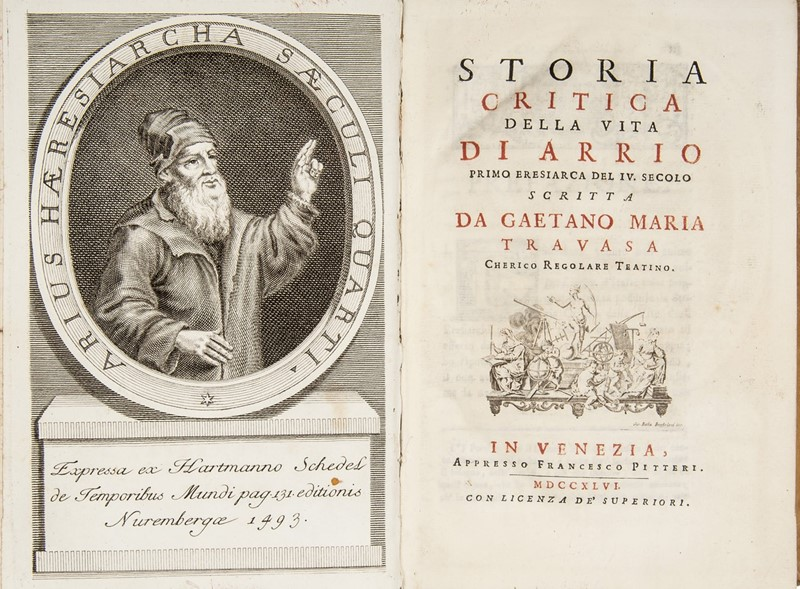
- Gaetano Maria Travasa's Storia Critica della Vita di Ario, Venice, 1746
- Born: Giorgio Travasa; May 31, 1698; Bassano del Grappa, Republic of Venice
- Died: 16 January 1774 (aged 75); Venice, Republic of Venice
- Occupations: Priest; Historian

Academic work
- Discipline: Church history, biblical studies and hymnology
- Sub-discipline: Early Christianity
- Notable works: Storia critica delle vite degli eresiarchi (1752-1762)

Gaetano Maria Travasa CR (31 May 1698 – 16 January 1774) was an Italian Theatine priest, ecclesiastical historian and scholar, best known for his five-volume history of early Christian heresiarchs, Storia critica delle vite degli eresiarchi.

== Biography ==
Gaetano Maria Travasa was born in Bassano on 31 May 1698. After studying theology at the Theatine college of Venice, he was ordained at the age of seventeen. He built up an extensive library, and displayed a deep interest in the history of the early Church, biblical studies and hymnology. Having conceived the plan of a great work on early Christian heresiarchs, in 1746 he published the Life of Arius. It took him ten years to deliver to the public the five volumes of his Lives of the heresiarchs of the first three centuries of the Christian era. The Life of Mani, which completed the last volume, is preceded by four dissertations: the first on the Adamites and on the Histoire Critique de Manichée et du Manichéisme by Isaac de Beausobre; the second on the historical value of the Acts of the disputation of Archelaus with Mani written by Hegemonius in the middle of the fourth century, and the last two on Scythianus and Terebinthus, the two predecessors of Mani. Travasa died in Venice on January 16, 1774.

== Works ==
Among his published works are:

- Storia critica della vita di Arrio primo eresiarca del IV. secolo. Venice: Francesco Pitteri. 1746.
- Storia critica delle vite degli eresiarchi. Vol. 1. Venice: Francesco Pitteri. 1752. In his discussions of first century heresiarchs, Travasa talks of Simon Magus; Menander; Cerinthus; and Ebion the putative founder of Ebionites.
- Storia critica delle vite degli eresiarchi. Vol. 2. Part 1. Venice: Francesco Pitteri. 1754. In the first part of the second volume of his history, Travasa talks of Saturninus of Antioch; Basilides; Carpocrates; and Prodicus.
- Storia critica delle vite degli eresiarchi. Vol. 2. Part 2. Venice: Francesco Pitteri. 1757. In the second part of the second volume of his history, Travasa talks of Valentinus; Cerdo; Marcion of Sinope; and Apelles.
- Storia critica delle vite degli eresiarchi. Vol. 2. Part 3. Venice: Francesco Pitteri. 1759. In the third part of the second volume of his history, Travasa talks of Tatian; Montanus; Bardaisan; and Hermogenes.
- Storia critica delle vite degli eresiarchi. Vol. 3. Venice: Francesco Pitteri. 1762. In the third volume of his history, Travasa talks of Noetus; Sabellius; Paul of Samosata; and Mani.
- Quaresimale [Lenten Meditations]. Venice: nella Stamperia Coleti. 1766.
