= Charles Allberry =

British egyptologist

Charles Allberry

Charles Robert Cecil Augustine Allberry (9 November 1911 – 3 April 1943) was an English Egyptologist and Coptic scholar. He was best known during his lifetime for his 1938 partial translation of A Manichean Psalm-Book, and posthumously as the model for C. P. Snow's character, Roy Calvert, introduced in The Light and the Dark (1947). Allberry served in the Royal Air Force in the Second World War and was shot down and killed in 1943.

== Education and career ==
Allberry was born in Sydenham in 1911, to Hilda and William Harry Allberry. His background was middle-class, his father being a manager, perhaps in the insurance industry. He attended St Dunstan's College, Catford and then went up to Christ's College, Cambridge, where he read classics, graduating in 1933. M. R. McLean, M. C. Burkitt and Stephen Gaselee are credited as having stimulated his interest in Gnostic and Manichaean writings at Cambridge. He studied Coptic with W. E. Crum and Herbert Thompson and, later, Egyptian hieroglyphs with Alan Gardiner.

Allberry become a fellow of Christ's in 1935, and was the college's inaugural Lady Budge Fellow (1936–39). Before the outbreak of war, he spent time as a researcher in Germany and elsewhere in Continental Europe, receiving a travel grant from the Lady Wallis Budge Fund in 1938. He collaborated with Carl Schmidt, Hans Jakob Polotsky and Torgny Säve-Söderbergh, among others.

== Research ==
Allberry translated Manichaean manuscripts into English, particularly from the Sub-Akhmimic dialect of Coptic, and was also involved in their interpretation. He worked on various manuscripts from the Chester Beatty Collection, and is particularly known for translating and editing the first edition of A Manichean Psalm-Book, Part II, in 1938. This manuscript, a collection of psalms, dates from the 4th century and was discovered at Medinet Madi, Faiyum, Egypt in 1930. Some of the texts in the Medinet Madi library were archived as part of the Chester Beatty Collection. In a contemporary review, the Coptic scholar W. E. Crum writes:

To have deciphered 230 pages of papyrus where many of them ... still show but a minority of indubitable letters, would in itself be a remarkable performance; to have produced plausible, often ingenious translations from such ruined materials, where lack of context and strangeness of subject-matter might well have discouraged more experienced scholars, is an achievement on which Mr. Allberry—whose first publication this is—deserves our congratulations and our thanks.

According to Theodor Harmsen of the Bibliotheca Philosophica Hermetica, Allberry's translation successfully realised the "lyrical character" of the material. I. M. F. Gardner and S. N. C. Lieu considered in 1996 that the translation was "rightly hailed as a literary as well as a philological triumph"; they also note that Allberry's English translation made this text the most famous of the Medinet Madi Manichaean manuscripts among the English-speaking research community. Allberry continued to work on the remaining 155 leaves of the psalm book for the remainder of his life.

Allberry compiled a Coptic dictionary, unfinished at his death, and contributed to Crum's dictionary. He published several short philological papers. In 1939, he succeeded Battiscombe Gunn as the editor of the Journal of Egyptian Archaeology, and continued in the role until joining the Royal Air Force. In 1949, several years after his death, the library of the Faculty of Oriental Studies, University of Cambridge, acquired part of his library, including unpublished manuscripts. According to the Faculty of Oriental Studies, Allberry "did much to further the study of Coptic in Cambridge".

== Personal life, Second World War service and death ==
Allberry was described in 1995 as "the golden boy of his generation" at Cambridge, "brilliant at everything" that he attempted. He was an active sportsman, as a cricketer displaying "much praised elegance as a batsman", and winning a half blue in lacrosse. He was a close friend of the novelist C. P. Snow, who was devastated by his death; Snow wrote, after receiving the news, that "in some ways he was the most gifted and the most remarkable of all of us, and the most unhappy." Allberry's circle also included John Plumb, Harry Hinsley and Gorley Putt. Putt, who knew Allberry as an undergraduate in the early 1930s, characterised him in a 1987 article as "an impish mystic" with a "rich comic sense", who could display "reckless, crazily joyous dare-devilry". He was Anglo-Catholic and converted to Roman Catholicism while in the Royal Air Force, adding the name "Augustine".

On 27 August 1942, Allberry married Patricia Katherine Grace Sandbach from South Wootton in Norfolk. They had a son, David Charles Anthony Allberry, born on 31 July 1943, after Allberry's death.

During the Second World War, Allberry worked in intelligence at Bletchley Park and then joined the Royal Air Force, where he served as part of Bomber Command. Whilst a flying officer, Allberry and five other men were killed during a raid on Essen on 3 April 1943 when their Handley Page Halifax was shot down by Oberleutnant Eckart-Wilhelm von Bonin. The aircraft crashed near Weert in the German-occupied Netherlands. Navigator Allberry and air gunner Sergeant Thomas Henry Webb were found at the wreckage, the former dead, the latter alive, but fatally wounded. Allberry is buried at Eindhoven (Woensel) General Cemetery, in the Netherlands.

== Model for Roy Calvert ==
Allberry is often considered the model for the character Roy Calvert in C. P. Snow's The Light and the Dark (1947) and several other novels in the Strangers and Brothers series, although Calvert is a scholar of Manichaean Sogdian, rather than Coptic. The character was played by Nigel Havers in the television adaptation of the novels (1984).

Snow's use of an identifiable friend in The Light and the Dark raised controversy. Gorley Putt refutes the notions that Allberry was a Nazi sympathiser and subject to bouts of depression. J. Neville Birdsall writes that the Calvert's depicted promiscuity was not a reflection of Allberry, and that the portrayal distressed Allberry's widow and son. Patricia Allberry (under her later married name of Lewis) published a memoir of Allberry in 1984, containing her own recollections as well as those of John Plumb (the former Master of Christ's College) and others. In a 1985 letter, she wrote:

While the physical description of Roy Calvert was very like my husband, as were his gaiety and charm, liveliness, brilliance and kindness; the manic-depressions, the immorality, the baiting of others, the pro-Nazism, and the final despairing act of joining the Air Force as an attempt at possible suicide, were completely untrue.
