= Zaccagni =

Zaccagni is a surname. Notable people with the surname include:

- Bernardino Zaccagni (c. 1455–1531), Italian architect
- Lorenzo Alessandro Zaccagni (1652–1712), Italian librarian and Patristic scholar and author
- Mattia Zaccagni (born 1995), Italian footballer
