= Treasure of Life =

Religious text of Manichaeism

The Treasure of Life is one of the seven treatises of the prophet Mani, written and regarded as part of the major canon of Manichaeism. The title is possibly derived from Christ's parable of the hidden treasure from Matthew 13:44, which is followed by the parable of the pearl in Matthew 13:45–46; incidentally, pearls are a major metaphor used in Mani's teaching. Also, the Syriac title, Simath Hayye, is identical with the name of an uthra (celestial being) in Mandaeism called Simat Hayyi.

It enjoyed popularity and was referred to by many anti-Manichaean polemic writers, including Hegemonius and Augustine of Hippo. The main theme appears to be Mani's anthropology of man, teaching “what parts of the Soul came from the pure Light, and what parts proceed from the vicious Darkness”. Duncan Greenlees states that Mani probably wrote The Treasure of Life while traveling through Greater Khorasan.

The Treasure of Life is central to one miraculous event surrounding the prophet Mani: when Mar Ammo was halted by a frontier spirit in the land of Sogdia, the disciple fasted and prayed for two days. Perhaps through a vision, Mani sensed his disciple's trouble and appeared at the watch-post on the frontier of Greater Khorasan. The prophet then taught Mar Ammo a passage from The Treasure of Life to recite. This appeased the spirit of the frontier, who saw that Mar Ammo was different from the similarly religious men of her land (probably Buddhists) and then allowed the disciple to resume his missionary work in the region.

== See also ==
- Simat Hayyi, an uthra (celestial being) in Mandaeism
