= Psalms and Prayers =

Religious text of Manichaeism

Psalms and Prayers is one of the Seven Scriptures of Mani.

This scripture is transliterated as "Afuyin Bu" (阿拂胤部) in Chinese, which is derived from Medieval Persian "āfrīn" Or Parthian "āfriwan", which means "praise".

== Contents ==
This scripture mainly contains poems written by Mani and his disciples. It is recorded in the Coptic "The Second Part of the Hymnal Collection" that Mani wrote two hymns, but these two poems are not found in the existing collection of Coptic poems. The Parthian document M40 R is said to be a fragment of "Vuzurgān Afrīwān" (Vuzurgān Afrīwān), praising the Father of Greatness, and is a translation of Mani's original Aramaic text. Parthian documents M538 and M75 are said to be fragments of the "Little Praise Sutra" (Qšūdagān Afrīwān), praising the Father, the Twelve Kings of Light, the world of light, the spirit of life, and the place of praise.

== See also ==
- Mani
- Seven Sutras of Mani
- Manichaeism
