= Manichaean Psalm Book =

Coptic Manichaean text from the 3rd or 4th centuries

Manichaean Psalter

Information
- Religion: Manichaeism
- Language: Coptic
- Period: late 3rd century, the mid-4th century

The Manichaean Psalm Book or Manichaean Psalter is a Manichaean text written in Coptic. It is believed to have been compiled in the late 3rd century or the mid-4th century. Excavated in 1929 as part of the Medinet Madi library, the Psalm Book is believed to contain remnants of some of the earliest extant Manichaean literature.

== History ==
The Psalm Book was discovered at Medinet Madi in Egypt. Like other works discovered at this site, it was written in a Coptic dialect typical of the Lycopolis region. After its discovery, it was edited and published by Charles Allberry in 1938–9 from manuscripts in the Chester Beatty collection and in the Prussian Academy of Sciences.

== Contents ==
It contains references to Old Testament apocrypha and references the Acts of Thomas, the Acts of John, and other Acts of the Apostles approvingly. It refers to some events believed to be derived from the Acts of Andrew. One of the psalms draws a line of tradition from Adam through Seth and Enoch to Mani. One author has described one of the hymns as containing a "deep love of Jesus".
