= Medinet Madi library =

Collection of Manichaean texts

The Medinet Madi library is a collection of Manichaean texts discovered at Medinet Madi in the Faiyum region of Egypt in 1929. There is a total of seven codices, some of which have been split up and are held in different collections across Europe. The texts, many of which remain unpublished and untranslated today, were composed in the Lycopolis dialect of Coptic during the 5th century A.D.

== Manuscripts ==
In 1930 and 1931, Alfred Chester Beatty and Carl Schmidt purchased the codices from antiquities dealers in Faiyum. The manuscripts were subsequently conserved by Hugo Ibscher and his son Rolf Ibscher in Berlin.

=== Berlin holdings ===
Carl Schmidt collected the following texts for the Berlin Papyrus Collection (Papyrussammlung Berlin) of the Staatliche Museen of Berlin in Germany. The collection is currently held at the Neues Museum in Berlin.

- P^{15995} Synaxeis
- P^{15996} Kephalaia (volume 1)
- P^{15997} Acts
- P^{15998} Letters
- P^{15999} Homilies (Berlin part)

=== Dublin holdings ===
A. Chester Beatty collected the following codices for his library in London, now the Chester Beatty Library in Dublin, Ireland.

- Codex A: Psalms
- Codex B: Synaxeis
- Codex C: Kephalaia (volume 2)
- Codex D: Homilies (Dublin part)

== See also ==
- Manichaean scripture
- Cologne Mani-Codex
- Psalms of Thomas
- Nag Hammadi library
- List of Gnostic texts
- Nag Hammadi and Manichaean Studies
