= Gospel of Mani =

3rd-century manichaean gospel written by Mani

The Living Gospel (also Great Gospel, Gospel of the Living and variants) was a 3rd-century gospel written by the Manichaean prophet Mani. It was originally written in Syriac and called the Evangelion (Classical Syriac: ܐܘܢܓܠܝܘܢ), from the Greek εὐαγγέλιον ("good news") and was one of the seven original scriptures of Manichaeism. A number of fragments are preserved in the Cologne Mani-Codex (discovered 1969) and on manuscript fragments found in Turfan beginning in 1904. Some Coptic manuscript fragments recovered at Fayyum appear to contain a sort of commentary or homily on the gospel.

The Iranian scholar Al-Biruni (973 – after 1050), who still had access to the full text at his time of writing, commented that it was a "gospel of a special kind", unlike any of the gospels of the Christians, and that the Manichaeans insisted that theirs was the only true gospel, and that the various gospels of the Christians misrepresented the truth about the Messiah.

There is a tendency in historical scholarship to confuse the Mani's Living Gospel with another of his works, known as Ertenk or Ardhang/Arzhang (ancient Persian: artha-thanha, approximately "message of truth") or The Picture Book. The Ardhang was in fact a picture-book, given the name of Eikōn in Greek and Coptic. This was a book containing illustrations to accompany and facilitate the understanding of Mani's cosmology. Photius (or pseudo-Photius) comments on the text, saying that it contains a falsified account of some of the acts of Jesus, while Peter of Sicily insists that it contained no such material.

It is known that the gospel had 22 parts, each labelled by a different letter of the Aramaic alphabet. The combination of two Turfan fragments allows the reconstruction of the text of the first part (alaph). The section deals with the nature of the "King of the World of Light" who resides at the "Navel of the World" but is also present on his whole earth, from without as from within, having no limits except where his earth borders on that of his enemy, the "Kingdom of Darkness". Schneemelcher (1990) suggests tentatively that the text may have been designed as a gospel of the gnostic type, perhaps intended to comment on or replace the Christian gospel.

== See also ==
- List of Gospels
- Father of Greatness
- Prince of Darkness (Manichaeism)
