= Euthalius =

Alexandrian bishop

Euthalius (d. 459) was a deacon of Alexandria and later Bishop of Sulca; he is chiefly known through his work on the New Testament in particular as the author of the "Euthalian Apparatus".

Of Euthalius' activities as a bishop little or nothing is known. Even the location of his episcopal see, Sulca, is a matter of doubt. It can hardly be identified with the see of that name in Sardinia. More likely it was situated somewhere in Egypt, and Lorenzo Alessandro Zaccagni conjectured that it should be identified with Psilka, a city of the Thebaid in the neighbourhood of Syene.

== Works ==
Following the example of earlier scholars like Ammonius of Alexandria, Euthalius divided the New Testament into chapters and verses. He grouped the New Testament, aside from the Gospels and the Book of Revelation, into sections for reading in public liturgical services; the 57 sections may have corresponded to the 53 Sundays of the year, along with Christmas, Epiphany, Good Friday, and Easter.

Euthalius's divisions were quickly adopted throughout the Greek Church, bringing uniformity to the liturgical readings. Today, scholars use their presence or absence in a manuscript as an indication of its age, since they were widely used by copyists.

Besides these textual labours, Euthalius drew up a catalogue of the quotations from the Old Testament and from profane authors which are found in the New Testament writings. He also wrote a short Life of St. Paul and a series of "Argumenta" or short summaries which are placed by way of introduction to the different books of the New Testament.

After having long lain in oblivion, the works of Euthalius were published in Rome, in 1698, by Zaccagni, then Prefect of the Vatican Library, in the first volume of his Collectanea Monumentorum Veterum Ecclesiæ Græcæ ac Latinæ. They can also be found in Gallandi (Biblioth. Pat., X, 197) and in Migne (Patrologia Graeca, LXXXV, 621).

== See also ==
- Euthalian Apparatus
