= Simat Hayyi =

Uthra (celestial being) in Mandaeism

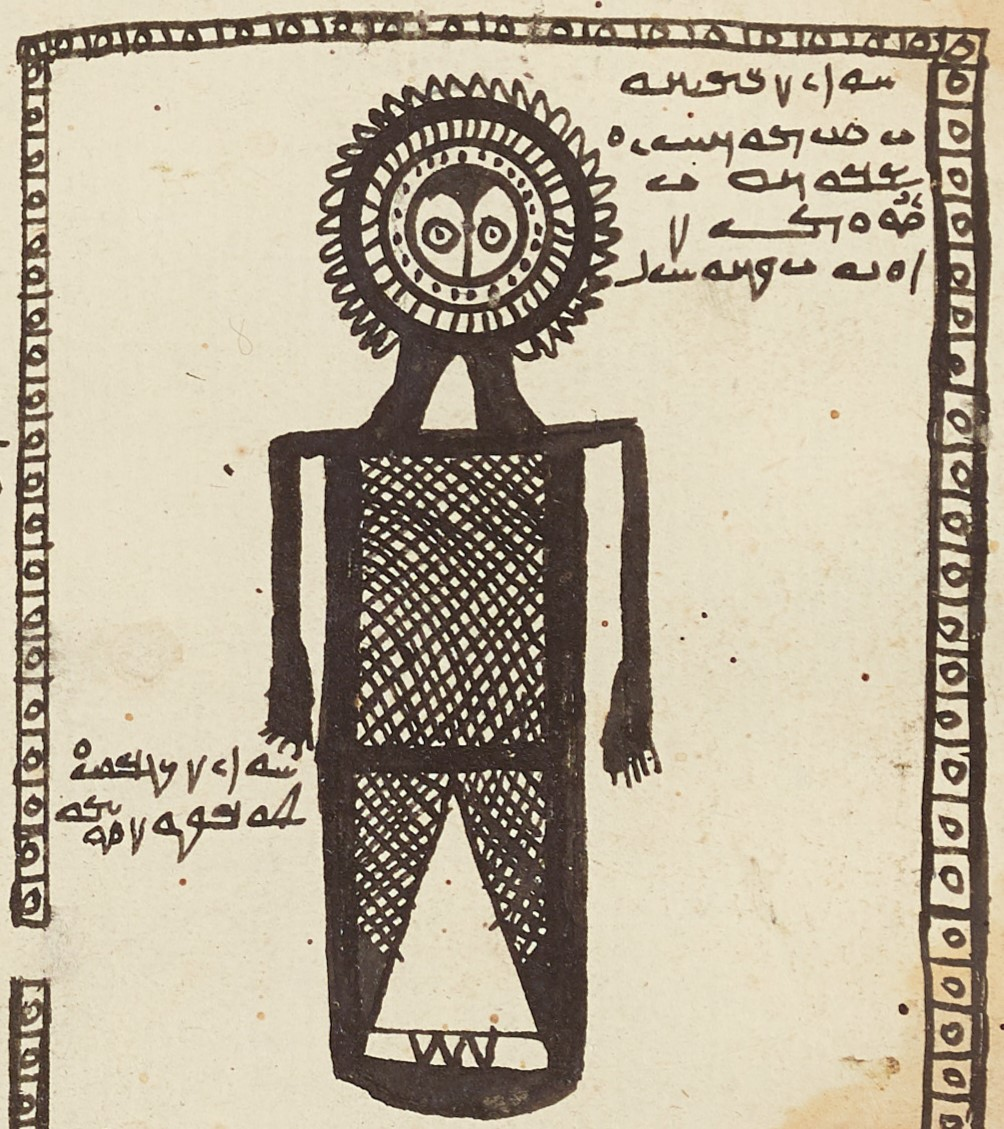
- Simat Hayyi in the Scroll of Abatur (DC 8)
- Other names: Treasure of Life, Simat Hiia
- Abode: World of Light
- Consort: Yawar Ziwa

In Mandaeism, Simat Hayyi or Simat Hiia (Classical Mandaic: ࡎࡉࡌࡀࡕ ࡄࡉࡉࡀ, lit. 'Treasure of Life', Modern Mandaic pronunciation: [siˈmɑt ˈhejji]), the feminine personification of life, is an uthra (angel or guardian) from the World of Light who is married to Yawar Ziwa.

The name Simat Hayyi ("Life's Treasure"), along with the name Niṭufta ("Drop", sometimes also translated as "Cloud"), are names used for the consort of Yawar Ziwa or the Great Mana in the World of Light.

Jorunn Jacobsen Buckley interprets a passage in the Qulasta referring to Simat Hayyi coming forth from the World of Darkness and eventually being raised to the Place of Light as referring to Ruha, noting that E. S. Drower had interpreted it in reference to Zahreil, but arguing that Zahreil never left the World of Darkness. Buckley therefore argues that the Mandaean texts consider Ruha will eventually attain redemption, and merge with her dmuta (ideal counterpart) in the World of Light.

Chapters 57–59 of the Mandaean Book of John are dedicated to Simat Hayyi.

== See also ==
- List of angels in theology
- Ezlat
- Sophia (Gnosticism) § As world-soul
- Barbelo
- Mana (Mandaeism)
- Treasure of Life, one of the works of Mani (title in Syriac: Simath Hayye)
- Matthew 6:19–20, treasures in heaven (translated in Syriac as ܣܺܝܡܳܬ݂ܳܐ sīmāṯā in the Peshitta)
- Parable of the Hidden Treasure
