= Terebinthus =

Purported pupil of Scythianus

Terebinthus (also Terebinthus of Turbo) was a purported pupil of Scythianus, during the 1st to 2nd century AD, according to the writings of Christian writer and anti-Manichaean polemicist Cyril of Jerusalem, and is mentioned earlier in the anonymously written, critical biography of Mani known as Acta Archelai.

== Biography ==
According to Cyril's anti-Manichaean works and in other Orthodox polemic, Terebinthus went to Judaea and later returned to Syria Palaestina ("becoming known and condemned" there), and ultimately settled in Babylonia. He is also said to have brought with him the books of Scythianus, which he presented upon his death to his lodger, a widow with a slave named Cubricus, who later changed his name to Mani. Mani allegedly studied the books, which thereby become the source of Manichean doctrine. (Note: St. Cyril of Jerusalem: "22. There was in Egypt one Scythianus, a Saracen by birth, having nothing in common either with Judaism or with Christianity. This man, who dwelt at Alexandria and imitated the life of Aristotle, composed four books, one called a Gospel which had not the acts of Christ, but the mere name only, and one other called the book of Chapters, and a third of Mysteries, and a fourth, which they circulate now, the Treasure. This man had a disciple, Terebinthus by name. But when Scythianus purposed to come into Judaea, and make havoc of the land, the Lord smote him with a deadly disease, and stayed the pestilence.: 23. But Terebinthus, his disciple in this wicked error, inherited his money and books and heresy, and came to Palestine, and becoming known and condemned in Judaea he resolved to pass into Persia: but lest he should be recognised there also by his name he changed it and called himself Buddas. However, he found adversaries there also in the priests of Mithras: and being confuted in the discussion of many arguments and controversies, and at last hard pressed, he took refuge with a certain widow. Then having gone up on the housetop, and summoned the daemons of the air, whom the Manichees to this day invoke over their abominable ceremony of the fig, he was smitten of God, and cast down from the housetop, and expired: and so the second beast was cut off.; 24. The books, however, which were the records of his impiety, remained; and both these and his money the widow inherited. And having neither kinsman nor any other friend, she determined to buy with the money a boy named Cubricus: him she adopted and educated as a son in the learning of the Persians, and thus sharpened an evil weapon against mankind. So Cubricus, the vile slave, grew up in the midst of philosophers, and on the death of the widow inherited both the books and the money. Then, lest the name of slavery might be a reproach, instead of Cubricus he called himself Manes, which in the language of the Persians signifies discourse. For as he thought himself something of a disputant, he surnamed himself Manes, as it were an excellent master of discourse. But though he contrived for himself an honourable title according to the language of the Persians, yet the providence of God caused him to become a self-accuser even against his will, that through thinking to honour himself in Persia, he might proclaim himself among the Greeks by name a maniac.")

^{23.} But Terebinthus, his disciple in this wicked error, inherited his money and books and heresy, and came to Palestine, and becoming known and condemned in Judæa he resolved to pass into Persia: but lest he should be recognised there also by his name he changed it and called himself Buddas. However, he found adversaries there also in the priests of Mithras: and being confuted in the discussion of many arguments and controversies, and at last hard pressed, he took refuge with a certain widow. Then having gone up on the housetop, and summoned the dæmons of the air, whom the Manichees to this day invoke over their abominable ceremony of the fig, he was smitten of God, and cast down from the housetop, and expired: and so the second beast was cut off.

— Cyril of Jerusalem

This story can be found also in Acta Archelai, an anti-manichean scripture written in Syriac language, which is ascribed to the late 4th-century AD writer Hegemonios. The story is again repeat in Lexicon Suidae (10th century) in an article dedicated to Mani. According to the Lexicon, the names of the books were: Mysterium, Evangelium, Thesaurum and Capitum (meaning "Mystery", "Gospel", "Treasury", and "Book of Chapters" respectively).

However, according to A. A. Bevan, this account "has no claim to be considered historical".

== Bibliography ==
- Bevan, A.A. (1930). "Manichaeism". Encyclopædia of religion and ethics. Rare Mystical Reprints. Vol. 8. Kessinger Publishing. ISBN 978-0-7661-3666-3.
- Rawlinson, H. G. (1916). Intercourse between India and the western world from the earliest times to the fall of Rome. University Press.
