= The Epistles (Manichaeism) =

Religious text of Manichaeism

The Epistles is one of the Seven Treatises of Manichaeism. It is derived from the Middle Ancient Persian dēwān, which means "Letter Collection". They have been long known among Manichaean scriptures They were originally written during the years of Mani’s public mission in the Sasanian Empire (ca. 240-276 C.E.). They were collected together by his followers and became one of the canonical books of the Manichaean community It served a purpose of explaining the doctrine and arguing for the correctness of Manichaeism

== Scripture content ==
This scripture is collectively referred to as the "Collection of Letters". The titles of 76 letters are listed in Ibn Nadim 's "Study of Groups of Books". The writers included Mani and his successors. The format of Mani's letters is very similar to that of St. Paul’s, because Mani took the form of Paul in the new era.

=== Sealed Letter ===
The most famous of the Manichaean letters is the Letter of the Seal, which Mani wrote to his followers from prison before his death. This letter is read by Manichaeans every year during the Feast of the Holy Throne. The closing part of the letter in Old Persian is preserved in the Manichean Prayer and Confession Book read by Hennings.

"...From my most beloved son Mar Ammo, from the dear children who are with me. To all priests, bishops and apostles, to all religious and lay people, to brothers and sisters - great and small, pious, perfect, righteous people, to all who have received the Gospel from Me, who rejoice in My precepts and good works, and who are firm in faith and have no doubts. Greetings to all of you."

=== Coptic text ===
In Egypt, some Coptic translations of some epistles were found, but the whereabouts of these translations are unknown during WWII. In the documents found in Kellis, fragments of a collection of letters were also found. Gardner published five fragments of letters:

"Mani, the Apostle of Jesus Christ, and all the other brothers who are with me - To <name lost> my loved one, and all the brothers who are with you, each one according to his name. Peace through God the Father, and our lord Jesus Christ, be it upon you my loved one; and may it guard you ... you, your body, and your spirit. The Father, the God of truth..."

Indeed, my loved one, I was obliged to write a mass of words to you this time; but God himself knows that these young people, whom you sent and who came, found me in some pain. For I was sick ... For all of thirty years to the day I was never sick like this occasion; and these young people who had come, I wished merely to proclaim the news to them, and by mouth send to you without letter. However, my heart was grieved by the words of the brothers who are ill; because of this I myself was oppressed, (and) in great pain have I written to you these ten sayings that I might comfort your heart my child. I myself suffered ... Know therefore that these words I heard in suffering, you too receive them in joy and confirmation; and you understand them.

... on account of (?) our good saviour, our god (?) Christ Jesus, by whose name I chose you (pl.). I have gathered you in by his hope; I have caused you to he woven together by his sign and his good; I have perfected you by his understanding; I have made you strong by <his> faith; I have made his wisdom and his knowledge shine forth in your teachings like the sun. His is this blessed name and this strong power. He is the one who can bless you all, my children, my loved ones. He can set his love in your head (?), [which (?)] is the Light Mind. His great faith he [can set (?) in] your guarding thoughts; his perfection he can establish [in your] good insights; and his long-sufferingness he [can ...] in your good counsels; his wisdom [...] also he can perform in your sharp considerations.

The saying that our lord proclaimed by his mouth [has been] fulfilled in me: The one who eats [salt] with me [has] raised his foot against me'. I (Man) myself too, this has happened to me: One who eats salt with me at the evening table, with my clothes upon his body, he has raised his foot against me; just as an enemy would do to his enemy. All these things have I suffered from my children and my disciples, they whom I have saved from the bondage of the world and the bondage of the body; whilst I bear them from the death of the world. I, all these things, I have endured and suffered in their season from a multitude.

I reveal to you, my child, my loved one: Whoever wills life, and to add life to his life, long-suffering is what awaits him; because without long-suffering he will not be able to live. For, long-suffering has every thing within it.

=== Paraphrase in Latin and Chinese ===
In addition to daily church business, some of Mani's letters are also expositions of doctrine. In Augustine's Latin writings, more than ten fragments of Mani's Fundamental Letters are preserved. These fragments mainly expound on the diachronic trinitarian doctrine of how this world was created.

Parts of this scripture are also quoted in the Dunhuang document "Incomplete scripture of Manichaeism": "The Nimman Sutra says: 'If the Dana do not have the good dharma, the pure light, the vigorous wisdom and benefit are all ready in the body, that is, the new man, with all his merits and virtues."

== See also ==
- Mani
- Seven Sutras of Mani
- Manichaeism
- The Fundamental Epistle
