= Scythianus =

1st century Alexandrian religious teacher

Scythianus (Ancient Greek: Σκυθιανός; fl. 1st-century CE) was an Alexandrian religious teacher who was, according to H.G. Rawlinson, the first Alexandrian to visit India.

He is mentioned by several Christian writers and anti-Manichaean polemicists of the 3rd and 4th centuries CE, including Archelaus of Caschar, Hippolytus of Rome, Cyril of Jerusalem, Epiphanius of Salamis, and is mentioned in the fourth-century work Acta Archelai, a critical biography of Mani from an orthodox perspective. Scythianus is thought to have lived in Palestine and to have been active in trade between the Red Sea ports and India. Scythianus is also said to have been to Jerusalem, where he disputed his doctrines with the Apostles.

== Biography ==
By birth he was a Saracen, he was a merchant in the trade with India, over the course of which he visited India several times, and acquainted himself with Indian philosophy. Having amassed great wealth, while returning homeward through the Thebais, he fell in, at Hypsele, with an Egyptian slave girl, whom he bought and married. He then settled in Alexandria and applied himself to Egyptian learning. Here he formed his philosophy, with the assistance of his one disciple and slave Terebinthus. According to Epiphanius, he was apparently trying to propagate the view "that there is something beyond the one who exists and that, so to speak, the activity of all things comes from two roots or two principles". Epiphanius further explained that Scythianus wrote four books: Mysteries, Treasure, Summaries, and a gospel (the Gospel of Scythianus, also mentioned by Cyril of Jerusalem).

=== Purported influence on Manichaeism ===
The account of Cyril of Jerusalem states that after Scythianus' death, his pupil Terebinthus went to Judaea" and Babylon. He used the name 'Buddas', which could mean he presented himself as a buddha and may suggest a link between his philosophy and Buddhism. Terebinthus brought with him the books of Scythianus, which he presented upon his death to his lodger, a widow with a slave named Cubricus, who later changed his name to Mani (from "Manes" in Persian, meaning "discourse"). Mani is said to have studied the books, which thereby become the source of Manichean doctrine. Hippolytus considered Scythianus as the predecessor of Mani, and wrote that he brought "the doctrine of the Two Principles" from India before Mani.

However, according to A. A. Bevan, this account "has no claim to be considered historical".

== See also ==
- Ancient Greece–Ancient India relations
- Kingdom of Israel

== Bibliography ==
- Bevan, A.A. (2003) [1930]. "Manichaeism". Encyclopædia of religion and ethics. Rare Mystical Reprints. Vol. 8. Kessinger Publishing. ISBN 978-0-7661-3666-3.
- Priaulx, O. de B. (January 1863). "Art. X.—On the Indian Embassies to Rome, from the Reign of Claudius to the Death of Justinian—continued from p. 298 of the XlXth Vol., Journ. R.A.S". Journal of the Royal Asiatic Society. 20: 269–312. doi:10.1017/S0035869X00165293. S2CID 250347258.
- Rawlinson, H. G. (1916). Intercourse between India and the western world from the earliest times to the fall of Rome. University Press.
