= Gorley Putt =

British academic and author

Samuel Gorley Putt OBE, FRSL
- Born: 9 June 1913; Brixham, Devon, England
- Died: 24 April 1995 (aged 81); Oakington, Cambridgeshire, England
- Education: Torquay Grammar School
- Alma mater: Christ's College, Cambridge and Yale University
- Occupations: Academic and author
- Writing career
- Period: Mid- to Late-twentieth century
- Subjects: English language and literature
- Notable works: A Reader's Guide to Henry James (1966); A Preface to Henry James (1986)

Samuel Gorley Putt OBE FRSL (9 June 1913 – 24 April 1995), was a British academic, author and stood as a Liberal Party candidate, but failed to win a seat, at the 1945 General Election. He actively discouraged people from using his first name, Samuel, and was known as simply Gorley Putt.

== Early life and education ==
He was the son of Poole Putt and Ellen Blake Gorley of Brixham, Devon. His father was killed in 1918 during the First World War when his ship was torpedoed. He was educated at Torquay Grammar School and in 1930 won a scholarship to Christ's College, Cambridge, where he received a First Class Honours in both parts of the English tripos in 1933. In 1934, with assistance from the Commonwealth Fund Fellowship he attended Yale University where he obtained his first MA. Putt's View from Atlantis released in 1955 recollected his experiences in America.

== Professional career ==
In 1936 Putt became an assistant in the BBC Talks Department, resigning after around a year. He worked as a freelance literary reviewer, spent a year lecturing in English at the University College of the South West of England in Exeter, and then briefly served as warden of a hostel and secretary of the appointments committee at Queen's University Belfast (1938–39).

During the Second World War, he entered the Royal Navy and in 1940 was serving on a destroyer protecting convoys; in 1941 he became a Naval Intelligence officer and served at Bletchley Park, rising to the rank of Lieutenant-Commander by 1946. Returning to Cambridge to dine during the war, it was noted that both in the Royal Navy and at Christ’s College it is the custom to drink the loyal toast sitting down; he accordingly toasted the King while sitting on the floor.

After the war, he went back to University College, Exeter, as the warden of Crossmead Hall, tutor to overseas students as well as the director of the International Summer School (1946–49). He became warden of Harkness House in London in 1949, remaining there until 1968. While there he also directed the Commonwealth Fund's international fellowship division (1966–68). For this work he was awarded the OBE (1966) and later received the Cavaliere, Order of Merit of Italy (1980).

In 1968 he became a Fellow, of Christ's College, Cambridge; Senior Tutor from 1968–78 and Praelector from 1976–80. During this period, he held visiting professorships at the University of Massachusetts (1968), University of the South, Sewanee (1976), University of Pisa (1979) and Texas Christian University (1985).

=== Writings ===
Putt described his experiences at sea in the Second World War in Men Dressed as Seamen (1943). He wrote about his experiences at Yale in View from Atlantis (1955). His autobiography was entitled Wings of a Man's Life.

He wrote two books on the author Henry James.

== Political career ==
He was Liberal candidate for his home constituency, the Torquay Division of Devon at the 1945 General Election.

General Election 1945 Electorate 72,973
Party	Candidate	Votes	%	±%
Conservative	Charles Williams	25,479	48.9	
Labour	George Cornes	13,590	26.1	
Liberal	Lt. Samuel Gorley Putt	13,003	25.0	
Majority		11,889	22.8	
Turnout			71.4	
Conservative hold		Swing		

He did not stand for parliament again. In 1966 he was awarded the OBE.

== Publications ==
Author

- Men Dressed As Seamen (1943), illustrated by Roger K. Furse
- View from Atlantis: the Americans and Ourselves (1955)
- Coastline (1959)
- Scholars of the Heart: Essays in Criticism (1962)
- A Reader's Guide to Henry James (1966)
- The Golden Age of English Drama: Enjoyment of Elizabethan and Jacobean Plays (1981)
- A Preface to Henry James (1986)
- Wings of a Man’s Life (1990)
- Arthur Mizener: Literary Critic with a Political Conscience (1991)

Editor

- Essays and Studies (1963)
- Cousins and Strangers (1956)
