= Ahn Shi Il =

Weekly observance in the Unification movement

Ahn Shi Il (안시일; 安侍日; literally "Day of Peaceful Attendance"), also transliterated Ahn Shil Il and officially rendered in English as the "Day of Settlement and Attendance", is a weekly observance in the Unification movement (Family Federation for World Peace and Unification, FFWPU). It was instituted by movement founder Sun Myung Moon on 19 April 2004 as a replacement for the seven-day Sabbath cycle, and is observed every eighth day according to the movement's lunar "Heavenly Calendar". Following its institution, FFWPU's main weekly worship service (경배식, gyeongbaesik), which had previously been held on Sundays, was reassigned to Ahn Shi Il.

== Name and etymology ==
The Korean term 안시일; 安侍日 comprises three Sino-Korean elements: 安 (an, "peace, settlement"), 侍 (si, "to attend upon a superior"), and 日 (il, "day"). Within the theology of the Unification movement, the term is contrasted with the standard Korean word for the Sabbath, 안식일; 安息日 (Ahn Sik Il, literally "day of rest-breathing"), in which the second character 息 (sik) denotes rest or cessation. The substitution of 侍 for 息 is interpreted by the movement as a shift from passive rest to active filial attendance upon God.

The longer original form of the name, 안착 시의의 날 (Ahn Chak Si-ui-ui Nal, "Day of Settlement and Attendance"), was used at the original proclamation in 2004 before being shortened to 안시일 for everyday use within the movement.

== History ==
The religious studies scholar Moon Sun-young writes that the Family Federation for World Peace and Unification announced the "Day of Settlement and Attendance" (안착 시의의 날) on 19 April 2004. The Unification studies historian Michael L. Mickler places the announcement within a few days of 13 April 2004, when Moon inaugurated the seokbang era, stated that the Sabbath had been brought to fulfilment, and named Ahn Shi Il as its replacement. The measure belonged to a series of declarations that Moon made between late 2003 and mid-2004 which, in the movement's theology, marked the passage from the era preceding the coming of heaven (선천시대; 先天時代, Seoncheon Sidae) to the era that followed it (후천시대; 後天時代, Hucheon Sidae).

The first Ahn Shi Il took place on 5 May 2004 at Yeosu, South Korea, alongside the proclamation of 쌍합십승일; 雙合十勝日 (Ssang Hab Shib Seung Il, "Day of the Double Combination and Victory of the Number Ten"). The proclamation is recorded in the movement's scripture Cham Bumo Gyeong (참부모경).

According to Mickler, the earliest observances were staged in Korea with considerable ceremony and featured rites in which delegates from rival Korean provinces, along with Western, Japanese and Korean participants, were bound together as brothers and sisters. These large public celebrations proved short-lived, however, and before long Ahn Shi Il came to be observed chiefly by individuals and families.

== The eight-day cycle ==
Unlike the seven-day weekly cycle of the Gregorian calendar, Ahn Shi Il recurs every eighth day on the movement's Heavenly Calendar. As a result, its observance falls on a different day of the secular week with each cycle. In Sun Myung Moon's teaching, the eight-day interval was tied to a broader symbolic numerology in which the number eight represented a new beginning beyond the seven-stage course of restoration that the movement's theology associates with the prior age.

== Observance ==
The observance of Ahn Shi Il in the Unification movement centers on three principal elements:

- the recitation of the Family Pledge (가정맹세);
- a representative prayer offered on behalf of the gathered community;
- Hoon Dok Hae (훈독회), the collective reading of texts by Sun Myung Moon.

Services are typically held in the early morning. According to Mickler, the observance "consisted of an early morning pledge service and devotional readings" and was originally intended to be conducted by all members of the movement on every eighth day. Moon Sun-young notes that the recitation of the Family Pledge on Ahn Shi Il is considered by the movement as a means of perfecting "an ideal family in the life of faith".

After 2004, the FFWPU's principal weekly worship service (경배식), formerly held on Sundays, was reassigned to Ahn Shi Il, although individual Sunday services have continued in some congregations. National FFWPU bodies publish annual calendars listing the Gregorian dates of Ahn Shi Il for their members.

== Theological interpretation ==
Within Unification theology, Ahn Shi Il is interpreted within a three-stage providential framework that distinguishes the Old Testament Age (associated with Judaism), the New Testament Age (associated with Christianity), and the Completed Testament Age (성약시대, Seongyak Sidae), with which the Family Federation for World Peace and Unification identifies itself. Within this scheme, Ahn Shi Il is presented as the new understanding of the Sabbath tradition appropriate to the Completed Testament Age.

The Unification movement teaches that Ahn Shi Il marks God's direct ownership of weekly time in the new era, in contrast to the prior age in which, according to Sun Myung Moon's teaching, even the Sabbath functioned within "the fallen world". The shift from Sabbath (안식일) to Ahn Shi Il (안시일) is presented by the movement as the temporal expression of the broader transition from the Completed Testament Age to the era of Cheon Il Guk.

The conceptual pairing of 선천 (Prior Heaven) and 후천 (Later Heaven) is drawn from broader currents of nineteenth-century Korean millenarian thought, notably the teaching of Choe Je-u, founder of Donghak.

== See also ==
- Unification Church
- Sun Myung Moon
- Cheon Il Guk
- Family Pledge
