= Shabuhragan =

Sacred book of the Manichaean religion, written by the founder Mani

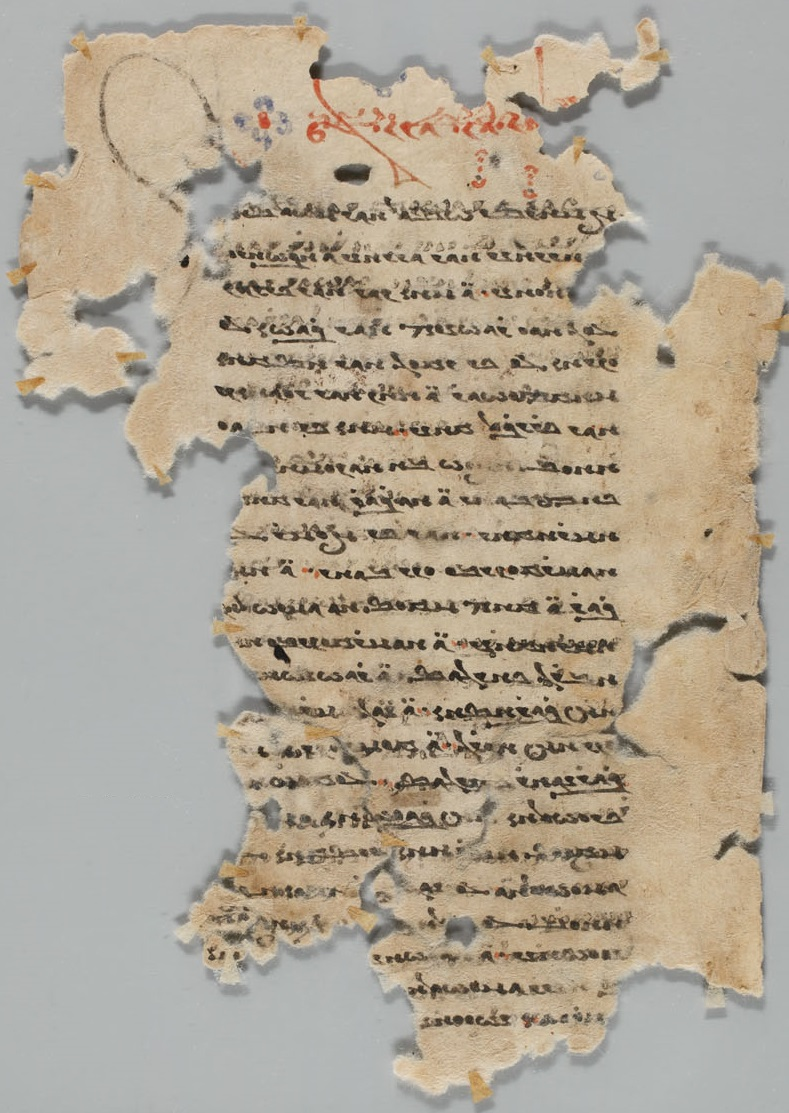
Fragment of a manuscript of the Shabuhragan dating from the 8th century AD, discovered in Turpan.

The Shabuhragan (Persian: شاپورگان, romanized: Shāpuragān), Persian for "dedicated to Šābuhr", (Note: Also, Chinese: 二宗经; pinyin: Èrzōng jīng; lit. 'Text of Two principles') was a sacred book of Manichaeism authored by the religion's founder, Mani (c. 210–276 CE), originally in Middle Persian, and dedicated to Shapur I (c. 215–272 CE), the contemporary king of the Sasanian Empire. This book is listed as one of the seven treatises of Manichaeism in Arabic historical sources, but it is not among the seven treatises in the Manichaean account itself. The book was designed to present to Shapur an outline of Mani's new religion, which united elements from Zoroastrianism, Christianity, and Buddhism.

The Middle Persian term for "Shabuhragan" is dw bwn wzrg'y š'bwhrg'n (lit. 'The Two Sutras Dedicated to Shabur'). The Chinese translation is abbreviated as The Text of Two Principles (Chinese: 二宗经; pinyin: Èrzōng jīng). Mani wrote this book in Middle Persian and presented it to Shapur I, the Sasanian Emperor, as an outline of the teachings of Manichaeism. In this book, Mani described his religion as the perfection and continuation of other existing religions, and called himself the "Sealed Prophet":

Throughout the generations, the apostles of God have never ceased to bring wisdom and work here. Thus, they came in one age through the Apostle Buddha into the countries of India; in another, through the apostle Zoroaster into Persia; and in another, through Jesus Christ into the West. After that, in this last age, the revelation came, which was prophesied to come to Babylon through Myself, Mani, the apostle of the true God.

Original Middle Persian fragments were discovered at Turpan, and quotations were brought in Arabic by al-Biruni:

The surviving fragments of the Shabuhragan focus on Manichaean eschatology. When the end of the world comes, the God of the wise world, Jesus, comes and performs the final judgment, separating the sinners from the righteous. The angels go and seize the sinners and cast them into Hell. The dead will rise, the righteous will ascend to Heaven, and all other beings will fall into Hell with them. The gods who support the world depart and the world collapses, and the fire of judgment enters from outside the universe and burns up the world, which will last for 1468 years. Evildoers suffer in this fire, but the righteous are unharmed. The evildoers ask for forgiveness, but will only be condemned. Finally, the sinners will be thrown into eternal prison along with the Devil.

According to the Chronicle of the Buddha, in the first year of Yanzai of the Tang dynasty, the Persian Fudodan introduced the Erzong jing to China.

== Sources ==
- Manicheism English translations of portions of the Shabuhragan can be found here.
- Middle Persian Sources: D. N. MacKenzie, “Mani’s Šābuhragān,” pt. 1 (text and translation), BSOAS 42/3, 1979, pp. 500–34,, copy at the Internet Archive. pt. 2 (glossary and plates), BSOAS 43/2, 1980, pp. 288–310 , copy at the Internet Archive.
