= Cologne Mani-Codex =

5th-century Manichaean manuscript

- University of Cologne
- First two pages of the Codex
- Also known as: On the Origin of His Body
- Date: c. 5th century AD
- Place of origin: Asyut
- Language: Koine Greek
- Material: Vellum
- Size: 4.5 by 3.8 centimetres (1.8 in × 1.5 in)

The Cologne Mani-Codex (Codex Manichaicus Coloniensis) is a tiny parchment codex, dated on paleographical evidence to the fifth century AD, found near Asyut (the ancient Lycopolis) in Egypt. Measuring 4.5 × 3.8 cm, the codex is the smallest ancient book yet discovered. It contains a Greek text describing the life of Mani, the founder of the religion Manichaeism.

The codex became known via antique dealers in Cairo. It consisted of four deteriorated lumps of vellum the size of a palm, and was in very poor condition. It was purchased for the Institut für Altertumskunde at the University of Cologne in 1969, and two of its scientists, Albert Henrichs and Ludwig Koenen, produced a first report (1970) and the first edition of this ancient manuscript, hence known as the Cologne Mani-Codex, which they published in four articles in the Zeitschrift für Papyrologie und Epigraphik (1975–82). Many emendations and alternate readings were offered in the following decade, and it was found that some of the minute fragments associated with the codex could be successfully incorporated into the body of text. A second edition was published in 1988. Two symposia have been devoted to the codex, and their papers published: in Rende (Calabria) (1984) and in Cosenza (1988).

The text, which bears the ambiguous title On the Origin of His Body, recounts Mani's introduction to the Jewish-Christian Elkesaite baptising sect. Mani's teachings are revealed to him through his spiritual companion and celestial twin (his syzygos). The Greek text bears traces that demonstrate it had been translated from an Eastern Aramaic or Old Syriac original. The logoi of Mani himself are repeatedly cited. That it is a compilation from earlier texts is suggested by the names, apparently of teachers that head each section of the text.

== See also ==
- Medinet Madi library
