= Lorenzo Alessandro Zaccagni =

Italian librarian and Patristic scholar and author

Lorenzo Alessandro Zaccagni (1652 -1712) was an Italian librarian, and Patristic scholar and author. His main contribution is a collection of texts relating to early controversies in Christianity, Collectanea monumentorum veterum Ecclesiæ græcæ et latinæ, published by the Vatican in 1698 with the approval of the Congregation of Propaganda Fide.

== Biography ==
Born in Rome to a Florentine family, he studied classics and became a scholar of Greek and Latin in Rome. He came under the patronage first of Cardinal Girolamo Casanatta and then of Cardinal Henry Noris.

Cardinal Casanate had been named Bibliotecario di Santa Romana Chiesa (Librarian of the Vatican) and had directed various congregations for the Pope, including the Offices of the Inquisition. Henry Noris was made assistant librarian in the Vatican by Pope Innocent XII. In 1700, on the death of Cardinal Casanate, Noris was given full charge of the Vatican Library. Both fostered the work of Zaccagni, which would have been previously considered suspect because it elucidated works discussing heresy.

As Prefect of the Vatican Library, Zaccagni had access to a copy of the Atti di Archelao by Hegemonius found at Monte Cassino with a version in the Vatican, as well as to the works of Euthalius. Such documents were among those included in his Collection.

Zaccagni was buried in the church of San Giovanni Decollato, and his inscription on the pavement stated that he was a man of honourable parts and practice, his books were celebrated by both Italians and foreigners; and he had raised the scholarship of the Papal states.
