= E-toki =

E-toki (絵解き; "picture deciphering, picture explaining") refers to a Japanese Buddhist practice of using an emaki (hand picture, a painted hand scroll) or picture halls (rooms with pictures either painted onto the walls, or containing a series of hanging scrolls) to explain a Buddhist principle.

== History ==
The earliest examples of e-toki are of a monk pointing to a picture in a picture hall and explaining the story of either Shakyamuni (the historical Buddha) or another important Buddhist monk, most notably Prince Shotoku who is often attributed with bringing Buddhism to Japan from China, or in the case of secular e-maki, exposing the hidden Buddhist message behind the images. The earliest examples of e-toki where only performed to a small group of the ruling class, and only upon special request.

These early performances were non-accompanied, and a solo monk would use a pointer with a soft cotton tip to tap the paintings in areas that exemplified the point to be made ( the cotton tip was to reduce the wear on the scrolls, many emaki show the wear of these performances despite this precaution with areas of the paint flaked off in vital image areas).

The practice started to move out of picture halls and become more of a public performance around the 11th century. At that time music began to accompany the picture telling. A blind monk would play the biwa as a sighted monk would tell the story and point to the picture. Music would be composed for specific stories, and the e-toki timed to correlate dramatic moments within the story to the music. Monks would often perform e-toki in exchange for gifts of food or money, and traveling e-toki performing monks would set up and preach on bridges or roadsides for any audience.

== Practice ==
E-toki is often performed by a monk or nun, but may also be performed by a layperson. Originally monks would preach from these pictures in private audiences for the elite and ruling class. As early as the year 931 AD the practice of e-toki is seen documented in written accounts. Though the practice of e-toki diminished after the 17th Century, it is still performed at festivals and upon special request at temples today.
