= Sacramental index =

Catholic statistic to determine parish activity level

The sacramental index is a statistic sometimes used by Roman Catholic bishops as a rough approximation of how active a parish is, based on the occurrence of sacraments or rites of passage. The precise formula varies; in the Archdiocese of Boston, the sacramental index for a parish is calculated by adding the total numbers of baptisms and funerals, and twice the number of weddings.

The index is used to help determine the number of priests assigned to a parish.
