= Medinet Madi =

Archaeological site in Faiyum, Egypt

Coordinates: 29.1931°N 30.6421°E

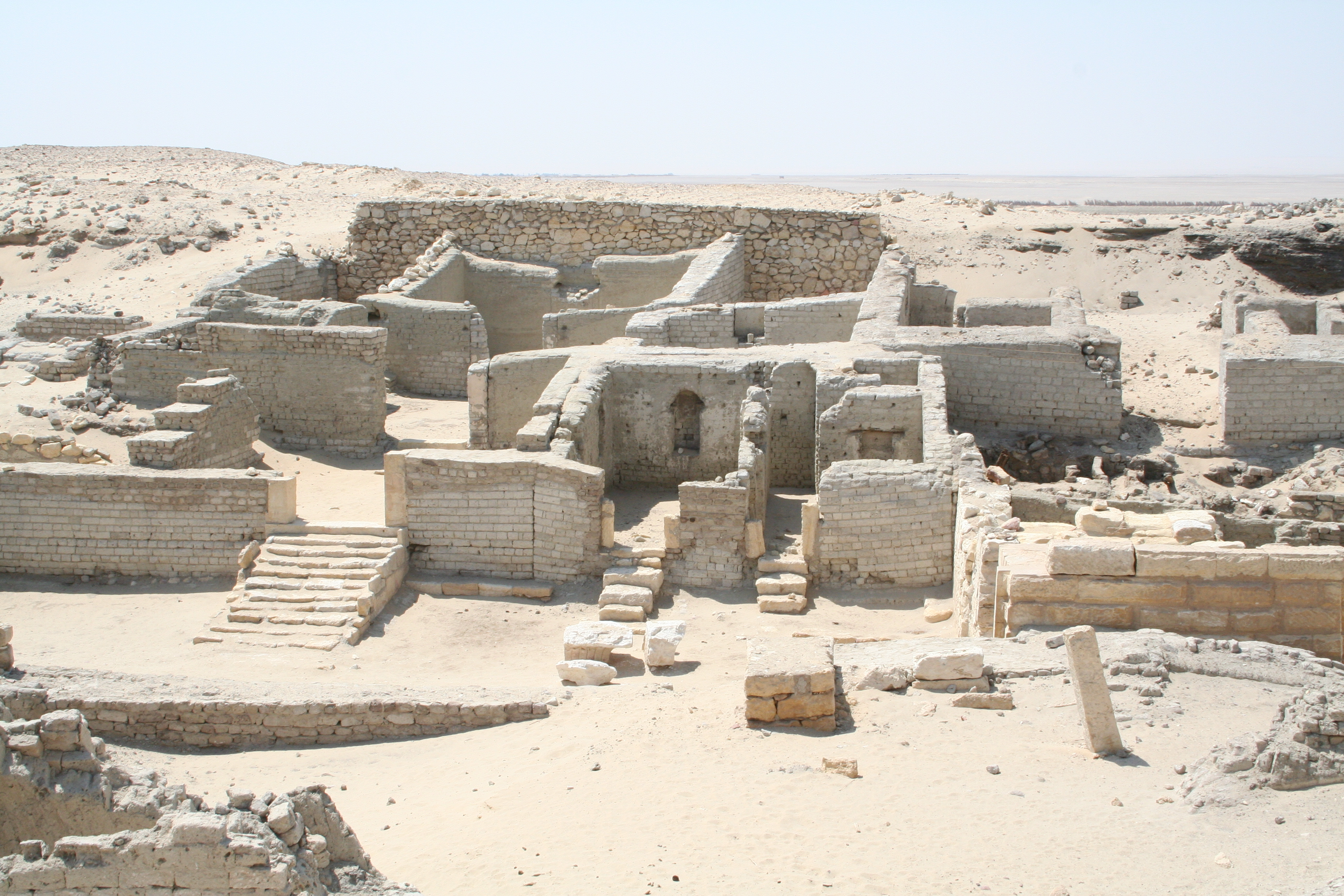
The ruins of Medinet Maadi temple

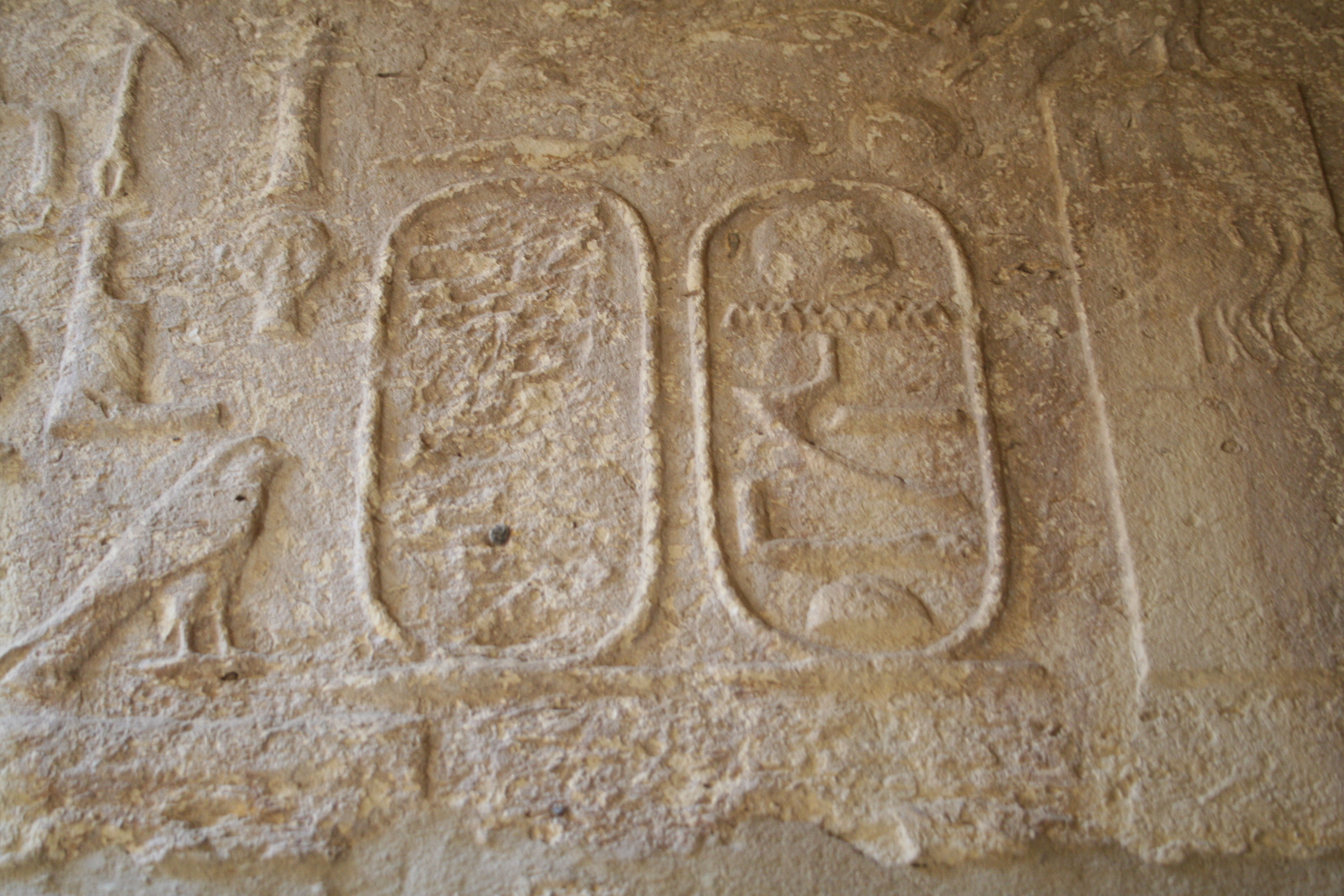
Amenemhat III's cartouche at Medinet Maadi temple

Medinet Madi (Arabic: مدينة ماضي), also known simply as Madi or Maadi (ماضي) in Arabic, is a site in the southwestern Faiyum region of Egypt with the remains of a Greco-Roman town where a temple of the cobra-goddess Renenutet (a harvest deity) was founded during the reigns of Amenemhat III and Amenemhat IV (1855–1799 BC). It was later expanded and embellished during the Greco-Roman period. In the Middle Kingdom the town was called Dja, later the town was known as Narmouti (Coptic: ⲛⲁⲣⲙⲟⲩϯ, ⲛⲁⲣⲙⲟⲩⲧⲉ, lit. 'the ones of Renenutet'), Narmouthis (Ancient Greek: Ναρμουθις) and Narmuda (Arabic: نرموده).

== The town ==
In the Middle Kingdom the town was called Dja, but not much is known about the town in this period apart from the well preserved temple. The temple still functioned in the New Kingdom. King Merenptah placed a statue of himself into the temple. After the New Kingdom the place was abandoned. People settled here again in Ptolemaic times. The Ptolemaic town was laid out on a grid pattern and is about 1000 × 600 m big. The main temples are in the Western part of the town. There is a long processional way going north to South. The town never had walls. However under emperor Diocletian there was built a castrum north east of the town. The fortress (50 × 50 m) is square with the main entrance in the South. At each corner there was a tower. Here was stationed the Cohors IV Numidarum. In Byzantine Times the population moved to the southern part of the town. Several churches were erected. The town was still occupied after the Muslim conquest of Egypt, but was abandoned after the ninth century.

== The Renenutet temple (temple A) ==
The dark sandstone inner part of the temple consists of a small papyrus-columned hall leading to a sanctuary comprising three chapels, each containing statues of deities. One column bears the name of Amenemhat III, the other with the name of Amenemhat IV. Both name also Renenutet. The central chapel incorporated a large statue of Renenutet, with Amenemhat III and Amenemhat IV standing on either side of her. In the inscriptions, the temple is simply called temple of Renenutet. Renenutet is called The living Renenutet of Dja.

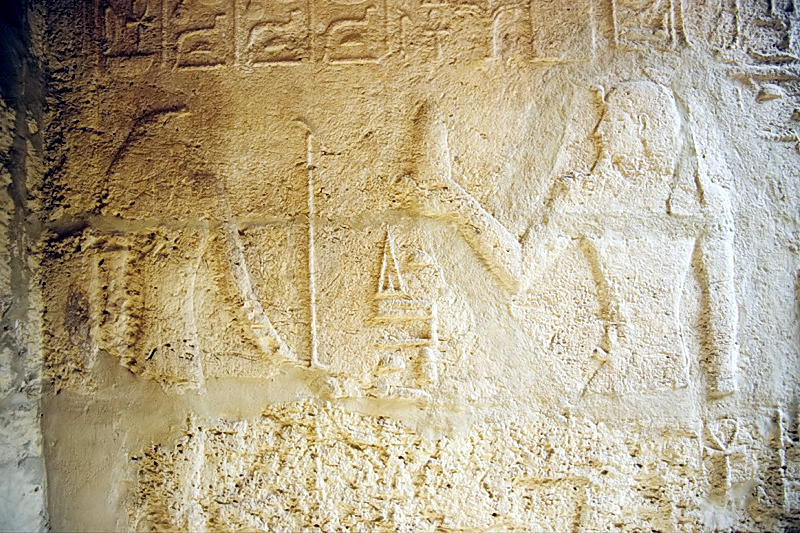
Scene on the East wall of the West chapel: Amenemhat III before Renenutet

The reliefs in the first hall are not well preserved, but they include a scene showing a king and the goddess Seshat, founding the temple. Behind the entrance room there follows another one, that is also all around decorated with reliefs. On the South side there is a scene showing Amenemhat III in front of Renenutet. The latter is depicted as standing woman with a snake head. Between both is shown in a much smaller scale the king's daughter Neferuptah. At the back of this room, on the North side, there are the three chapels. The first one, on the West side, is dedicated to Renenutet. She appears as the main deity at the back of the chapel. On the side walls are shown on the West side Sobek, and on the East side Renenutet. The second chapel was dedicated to Renenutet and Sobek. Renenutet appears on the West wall and on the back (North) wall, standing behind king Amenemhat III. The king is standing in front of Sobek, who also appears on the East wall in front of the same king. On the East wall appears Sobek again. The last chapel was again mainly dedicated to Renenutet. She appears on the West and on the back wall in front of Amenemhat III, while on the East wall Sobek is standing in front of a king.

The Ptolemaic parts of the temple comprise a paved processional way passing through an eight-columned kiosk leading to a portico and transverse vestibule. It has been suggested that the unusually good preservation of this temple complex, excavated by a team of archaeologists from the University of Milan in the 1930s, may have been due simply to its relative seclusion.

== Temple B ==
Temple B was built at the back of temple A with the main entrance facing to the North. The plan of this building is similar to that of temple A. There is an open broad courtyard at the front. There follows a hall and at the back there are three chapels. The central chapel has a niche at the back. The temple was dedicated to Isis-Thermouthis (Thermouthis is the Greek name for Renenutet). The temple's decoration is unfinished. There are some figures carved as reliefs on the temple walls. Two badly preserved figures flanking the entrance. On the leftside of the facade was carved a sitting figure, that was never finished.

== Temple C ==
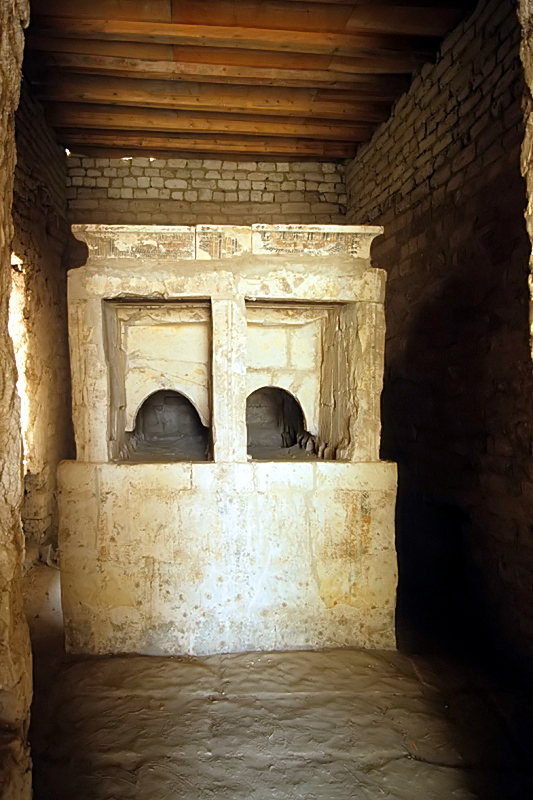
The main chapel of Temple C with the two naoi

Temple C was so called by the excavators. It was dedicated to the cult of two crocodile mummies. The temple complex was excavated from 1995 to 1999. The temple lies east of the Renenutet temple with the main entrance facing the latter temple complex. It dates to the Ptolemaic Period and was found well preserved. The walls are still up to four meters high. The temple proper consists of a small courtyard with a chapel behind it. The chapel contains two naoi. In each of them was found the mummy of a crocodile. In front of the temple is a bigger courtyard and there are on both sides buildings. They were perhaps for economical use. North of the temple was excavated a vaulted chamber. The interior is divided into two parts by a stone wall. Attached to the wall there is a basin. In the basin where found more than thirty crocodile eggs. This might indicate that this vaulted room was once a nursery for crocodiles. The temple complex was in use till the Fourth century AD and then abounded.

== 2006 excavations ==
Medinet Madi is "the only intact temple still existing from the Middle Kingdom" according to Zahi Hawass, a former Secretary-General of the Supreme Council of Antiquities (SCA). The temple's foundations, administrative buildings, granaries and residences were recently uncovered by an Egyptian archaeological expedition in early 2006.

== Ostraca: A glimpse at the everyday life of the Egyptian priests of Medinet Madi ==
In a house on the temple district, thousands of inscribed potsherds, so-called ostraca, were found during archaeological excavations in 1938. The majority of notes on these ostraca date from the late second and early third centuries. They are written in Demotic, Greek and Demotic-Greek script. In regard to the history of writing, these ostraca are thus evidence of how Coptic script developed from the Egyptian and Greek written languages.

In terms of content, the texts can be assigned to the milieu of priests and provide insights into various facets of their everyday life in the temple district: preserved are, for instance, notes on the calculation of personal horoscopes, school texts and a guide for archivists. Particularly personal insights into life behind the temple walls are provided by a dossier of more than one hundred ostraca, on which the priest Phatres compiled notes for a petition to the authorities. In these texts, he reports on corruption, cult-related misconduct, and disputes in the local temple college.

In the late second century AD, the priests of Narmouthis drafted a petition to the authorities asking to be assisted in the performance of cult services by the priests from Soknopaiou Nesos (in the northern Faiyum). The draft was written on one of the ostraca that were found in the temple district. The text is thus an important document for understanding how temples cooperated with each other when there was a shortage of staff.

== Coptic texts ==
Coptic texts were uncovered near Medinet Madi in 1929. Among them was the Manichaean Psalm-book that includes the Psalms of Thomas.
