= Pragmateia =

Religious text of Manichaeism

The Pragmateia (Greek: Πραγματεία, lit. 'Treatise'; traditional Chinese: 證明過去教經; simplified Chinese: 证明过去教经; pinyin: Zhèngmíng guòqù jiào jīng; lit. 'Proof of the Past Teachings'), is one of the seven major books of the prophet Mani, written and regarded as part of the major canon of Manichaeism.

The text is now lost and its exact contents are currently unknown. According to historical records and fragments found in Turfan, the text was likely focused on human history. The text is also mentioned in accounts of the Monijiao branch of Manichaeism (including its religious and political movement known as the White Lotus Society) from the Song dynasty.
