= Arzhang =

Disappeared holy book of the Manichaean religion

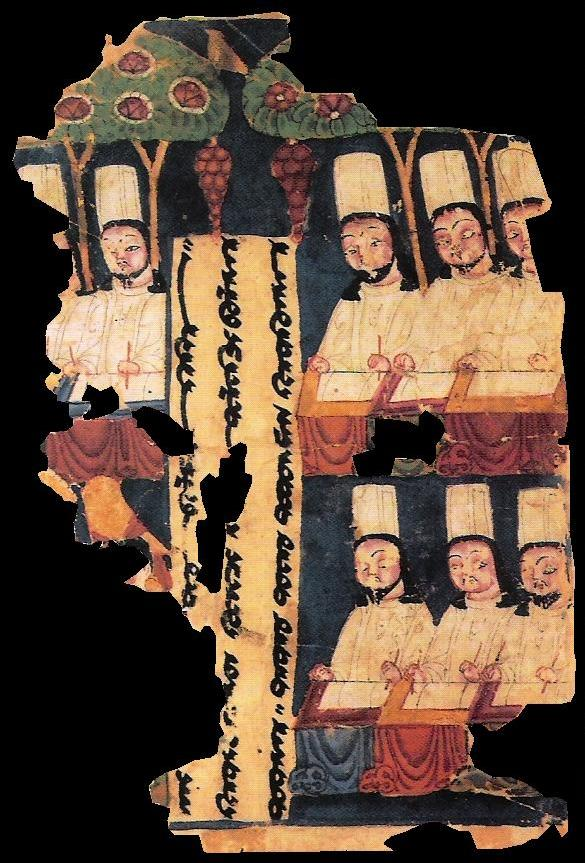
- Leaf from a Uyghur-Manichaean version of a book of pictures; an iteration of Mani's pictorial teaching with the Arzhang

Information
- Religion: Manichaeism
- Author: Mani
- Language: Syriac
- Period: Early Christianity

The Arzhang (Persian: ارژنگ, romanized: Aržang/Arzhang; Coptic: Eikōn; Parthian: dw bwngʾhyg [dō bunɣāhīg], meaning "Worthy"), also known as the Book of Pictures, was one of the holy books of Manichaeism. It was written and illustrated by its prophet, Mani, in Syriac, with later reproductions written in Sogdian. It was unique as a sacred text in that it contained numerous pictures designed to portray Manichaean cosmogony, which were regarded as integral to the text.

The original Arzhang illustrated by Mani has been lost and its exact content is unknown. However, it is known that its illustrations were of appreciable quality, and copies were preserved in the Middle East as late as 1092 AD, when it is recorded that the library of Ghazni held a copy. Since the discovery of Manichaean artwork during the German Turfan expeditions, scholars began piecing together the style of the Arzhang and reassessed the influence of Manichaean art in general.

== Content and purpose ==
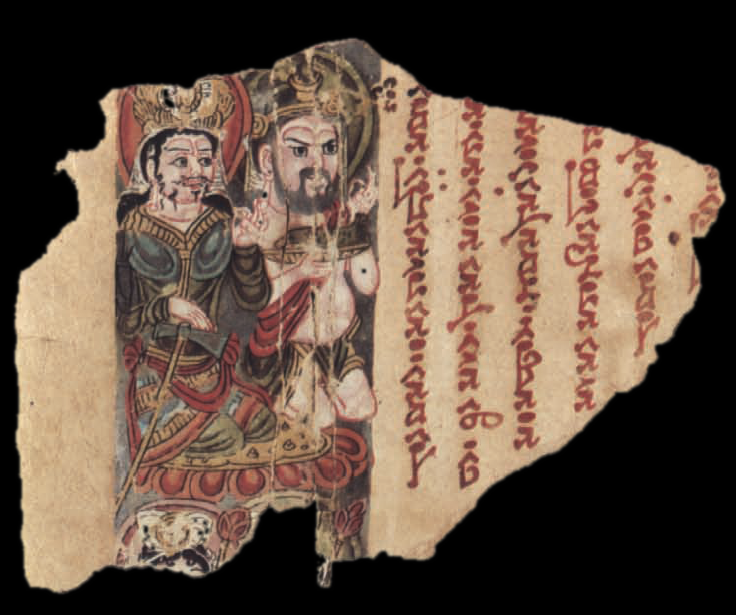
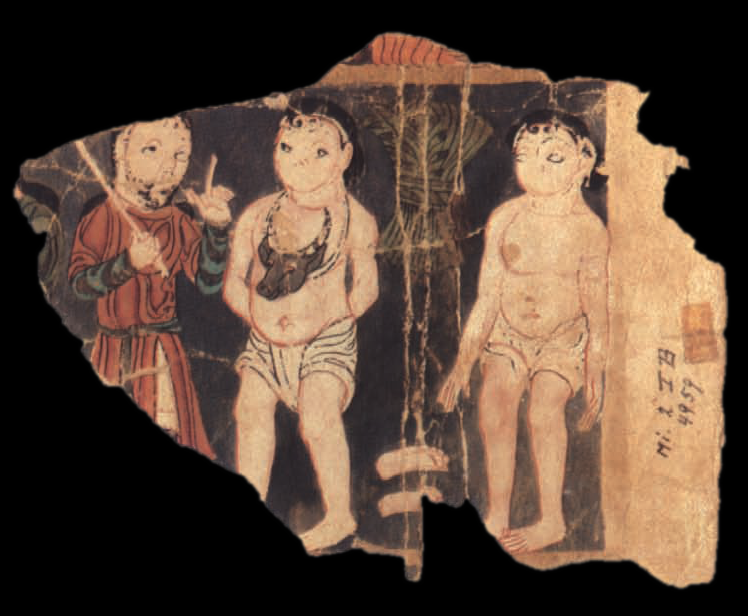
Leaf from a Uyghur-Manichaean version of a book of pictures, Turfan, c. 8th-9th century

One of Mani's primary beliefs was that the arts (namely painting, calligraphy, and music) were of the same esteem as the divine spirit (Middle Persian: Mihryazd), believing that the creation of art was comparable to god's creation of living forms, and therefore the experience of art was more of a divine act than any other in the material world. Throughout the 1400-year history of Manichaeism, didactic books of paintings were used to illustrate the religion's teachings and beliefs. From the beginning, the prophet Mani envisioned his religion (which included the teachings of Zarathustra, Buddha, and Christ) as a universal and therefore "transcultural" entity, leading to its vast spread from Europe to Asia. The Manichaean mission employed multifaceted means of communication (including oral, textual, and pictorial) so the beliefs may adapt to the variety of cultures it entered. These picture books covered the primary themes of Manichaeism, such as its dualism of light and darkness, maps of a religious universe, the process of human salvation, as well as various Manichaean prophets and deities, and were considered principal pieces of the Manichaean canon.

On the subject of Mani's original paintings, Zsuzsanna Gulácsi notes that the "paintings were created first in mid-third century Mesopotamia with direct involvement from Mani ... and were later preserved by being copied and adapted to a wide variety of artistic and cultural norms, as the religion spread across the Asian continent." Gulácsi points to the Yuan-era silk paintings Manichaean Diagram of the Universe and Sermon on Mani's Teaching of Salvation as examples of sinicized variations of Mani's tradition of using a Book of Pictures as a method of teaching, specifically providing insight into the cosmology of the era's Chinese Manichaeism. After the discovery of fragmentary pieces of Uyghur-Manichean art in the ruins of Turfan, Western Regions, scholars began turning to the newly uncovered remains of Manichaean book art in order to assess through the fragments what could resemble the original style of the Arzhang.

== Influence and legacy ==
Following the discovery of Manichaean paintings in Turfan, art historian Thomas W. Arnold suggested that the Manichaean tradition of illustrative bookmaking was the source of Persian miniature painting style during the time of the Safavid Empire. Arnold stated: "The only other religious art that could have produced these pictures was the Manichaean, the Eastern Character of the types of face and figure, and the similarity in technical details to the Manichaean paintings that have survived in Central Asia, suggest that this is the source to which these strange pictures must be traced back." Kamāl ud-Dīn Behzād, the most famous of the Persian miniature painters, was praised by the contemporaneous Afghan historian Albdulkarim Khondamir, who wrote; "[Behzād's] Mani-like brushwork overwhelmed all other painters." From her studies of the fragments, Zsuzsanna Gulácsi concluded that a set of the artwork come from an authentically Manichaean book of pictures, harboring elements (such as the iconography, brush style, and use of colors) that originated in Mani's original Arzhang and were turned into the traditional painting style of future generations of Manichaeans. Additionally, the Turfan fragments possess a primarily Persian appearance, specifically similar to the art that has survived from the Sassanid era (during which Mani lived), with such identifiable elements as the quality of the lines, the simplicity of the faces, and the exuberant amount of detail in the folds of the garments. These similarities link the Turfan fragments to what is known of art in the Greater Iran area before the arrival of Islam.

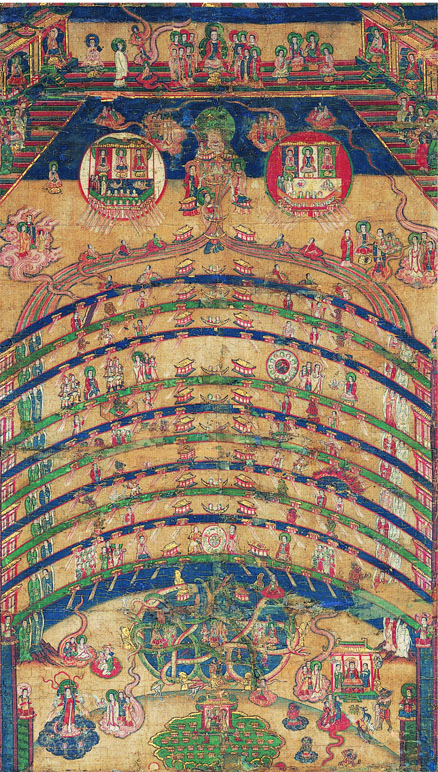
Detail of the Manichaean Diagram of the Universe, c. 13th-14th century

The Buddhist practice known as e-toki (絵解[き], meaning "picture deciphering, picture explaining") was used by the Japanese Pure Land Buddhists as a method of teaching, beginning in China as early as 931 AD. Etoki performances typically filled halls with vertical scrolls that illustrated the story of the Buddha and various Buddhist principles. Like Buddhism itself, this practice spread into Japan from China. The scrolls also often illustrated the life of Prince Shōtoku, who is credited as the founder of Japanese Buddhism. During the Yuan dynasty and the Ming dynasty (during which the Hongwu Emperor banned Manichaeism in 1370), the Monijiao Manichaeans in southern China became close to the Pure Land Mahayana Buddhists, synthesizing the tradition of didactic illustration that began with the Arzhang with the formal attributes of the hanging scrolls used in e-toki, while also syncretizing Buddhist and Manichaean beliefs.

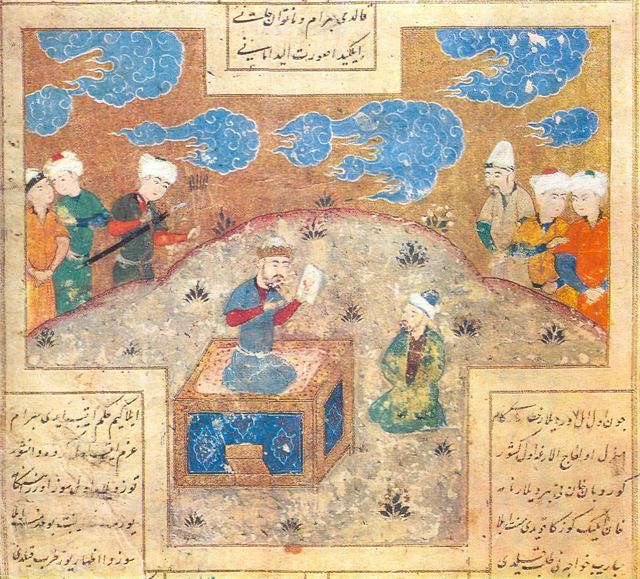
Mani presenting an illustration to King Bahram I in a painting by Ali-Shir Nava'i, c. 16th century

An Islamic account of Mani's life described the prophet as a painter who founded a sectarian movement against the Zoroastrian state religion of Sassanid Persia under Shapur I. Prompted by threats, Mani fled to Turkestan, where he gained followers and painted a few temples (incidentally, a few paintings in Bamyan are attributed to Mani). Mani then spent a year in the solitude of a cave after telling his followers that he was going to heaven. After the year, Mani returned with the Arzhang, which he said he had brought down from heaven. After the death of Shapur, he and a large procession of followers returned to Persia. According to this account, the new king Bahram I received and favored Mani, but he was later flayed alive for his heresies. In a 16th-century painting by Ali-Shir Nava'i from modern-day Uzbekistan, Mani is shown at the throne Bahram as the king inspects one of the prophet's illustrations.

In Islamic tradition (excluding Ibn al-Nadim's account of Mani's life) Mani is referred to as "Mani the Painter", almost always replacing the topos of "Founder of a Religion". In addition, Arzhang is the name of the daeva (demon) in Ferdowsi's Shahnameh who takes Kay Kāvus to Mazanderan, and whom Rostam defeats in his sixth trial. The word "arzhang" meaning "worthy" in Middle Persian is likely the reason for the shared names, although it is coincidental (if Thomas W. Arnold's theory on the Manichaean origin of Persian miniature painting is correct) that the character of Arzhang first would've been illustrated in the style of the Arzhang.

== See also ==
- Manichaean art
