= Hegemonius =

4th-century Christian writer

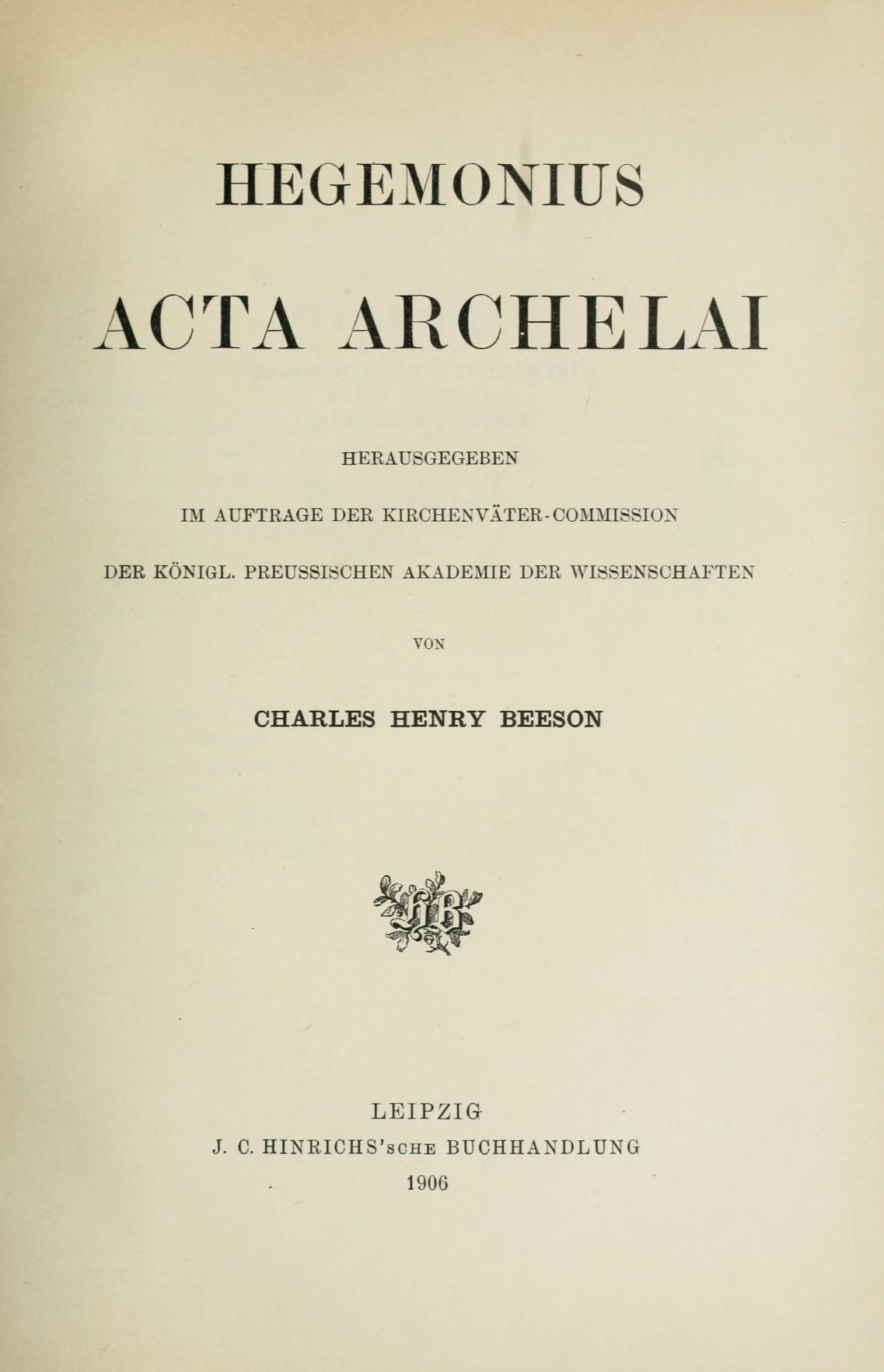
Frontispiece of the Acta Archelai, Charles H. Beeson edition, 1906

Hegemonius (Greek: Ηγεμόνιος) or Pseudo-Hegemonius was a 4th-century Christian who is known only from his presumed authorship of the Acta Archelai, a work on Manichaeism preserved only in Latin.

"Traditionally attributed to Hegemonius, the Acta Archelai is the oldest and most significant anti-Manichaean polemical text. Originally composed in Greek in the fourth century, it has survived mainly in a near contemporary Latin translation - substantial section of the Greek version has however survived in the Panarion of Epiphanius. The Acta gives a fictional account of a debate between Mani and Archelaus, the Christian bishop of the city of Carchar in Roman Mesopotamia as well as an important summary of his teaching on cosmogony and a highly polemical version of Mani's life. The work would later exercise enormous influence on anti-Manichaean writings in both Late Antiquity and Middle Ages."

A Latin edition Acta Disputationis Archelai, Episcopi Mesopotamia et Manetis Haresiarch was published by Lorenzo Alessandro Zaccagni, librarian of the Vatican Library, in Collectanea monumentorum veterum Ecclesiae graecae et latinae. Rome, 1698. Charles H. Beeson's edition appeared in 1906. An improved critical edition of the text of Breeson was published by Brepols Publishers (Turnhout, Belgium) in 2001. An English translation of Zaccagni's edition by S. D. F. Salmond appeared in 1871. A new translation by Mark Vermes of Breeson's edition appeared in 2001.
