= Mani (prophet) =

3rd-century prophet and founder of Manichaeism

Prophet Mani
- مانی
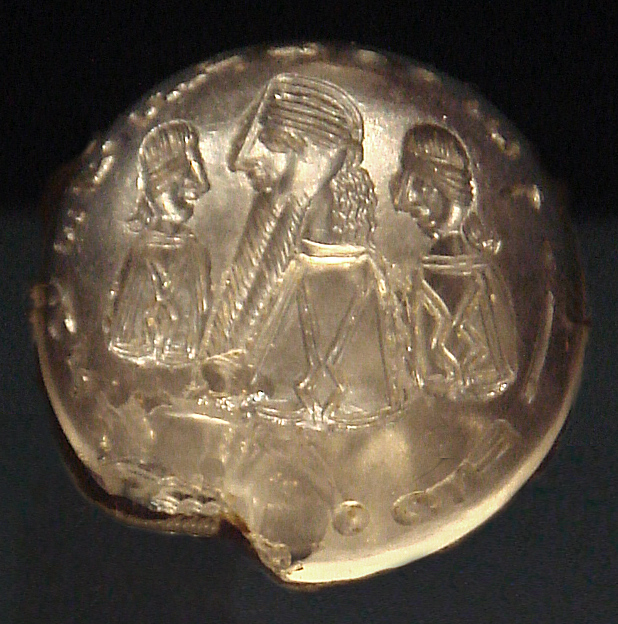
- Sealstone of Mani, rock crystal, possibly 3rd century AD, Iraq. Cabinet des Médailles, Paris. The seal reads "Mani, the apostle of Jesus Christ", and may have been used by Mani himself to sign his epistles.
- Preceded by: Jesus

Personal life
- Born: c. April AD 216 Mardinu (near Mahuza), Babylonia, Parthian Empire (modern-day Iraq)
- Died: 2 March AD 274 or 26 February AD 277 (aged 57–58 or 60–61) Gundeshapur, Sasanian Empire (modern-day Iran)
- Cause of death: During imprisonment, or by execution, on the orders of Bahram I
- Parent(s): Pātik, Mariam
- Citizenship: Sasanian Empire
- Notable work: Manichaean scripture

Religious life
- Religion: Jewish Christianity (later Manichaeism)
- Denomination: Elcesaites
- Founder of: Manichaeism

Mani (Note: Middle Persian: 𐭌𐭀𐭍𐭉/𐭬𐭠𐭭𐭩/𐮋𐮀𐮌𐮈/𐬨𐬁𐬥𐬌/𐫖𐫀𐫗𐫏 Māni, New Persian: مانی Māni, Chinese: 摩尼 Móní, Syriac: ܡܐܢܝ Mānī, Greek: Μάνης, Latin: Manes; also Μανιχαῖος, Latin Manichaeus, from Syriac ܡܐܢܝ ܚܝܐ Mānī ḥayyā "Living Mani") (/ˈmɑːni/; c. April AD 216 – 2 March AD 274 or 26 February AD 277) was an Iranian prophet and the founder of Manichaeism, a religion most prevalent in late antiquity.

Mani was born in or near Ctesiphon (south of modern Baghdad) in Mesopotamia, at the time part of the Parthian Empire. Seven of his major works were written in Syriac, and the eighth, dedicated to the Sasanian emperor Shapur I, was written in Middle Persian. He died shortly after being imprisoned by Bahram I in Gundeshapur.

== Etymology ==
The exact meaning of the name, or rather title, of "Mani" remains unsolved. It may have derived from Babylonian-Aramaic Mânâ [luminescence]. Mandaeans used the term mânâ rabba, which means "Enlightened Lord/King". Ancient Greek interpretations were skeuos (σκεῦος, "vessel, instrument") and homilia (ὁμιλία, "intercourse, company, communion, instruction").

The same slightly contemptuous "a certain" (Manes quidam) also appears in Hegemonius' Acta Archelai (4th century), however, Hegemonius contributes a detailed description of Mani's looks. Mani's names became the object of uplifting transformation (Greek, Coptic Mannichaios, Latin Mannichaeus, i.e., Mannam fundens, "pouring out Manna"). Alternatively, due to Mani's possible origins in an Elchasai community, "Mani" could be a hypocorism of the Hebrew name Menahem ("the consoler" or "comforter").

== Sources ==
In 1969 in Upper Egypt a Greek parchment codex dating to c. AD 400 was discovered. It is now designated Codex Manichaicus Coloniensis because it is conserved at the University of Cologne. Combining a hagiographic account of Mani's career and spiritual development with information about Mani's religious teachings, and containing fragments of his writings, it is now considered the most reliable source of information about the historical Mani.

All other medieval and pre-medieval accounts of his life are either legendary or hagiographical, such as the account in Fihrist by Ibn al-Nadim, purportedly by al-Biruni, or were anti-Manichaean polemics, such as the 4th-century Acta Archelai. Among these medieval accounts, Ibn al-Nadim's account of Mani's life and teachings is generally speaking the most reliable and exhaustive. Notably, the (in other accounts prominent) image of the "Third Ambassador" is only represented through a brief mention of the name bašīr, "messenger of good news", and the topos of "Mani the Painter" (which in other Islamic accounts almost completely replaces that of "the founder of a religion") is completely absent.

== Life ==
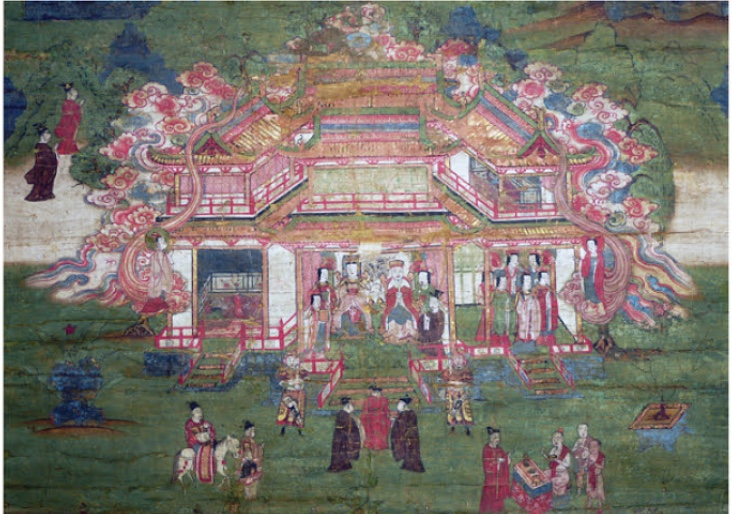
Mani's Parents, a 14th/15th-century silk painting depicts Mani's parents sitting in a palatial building.

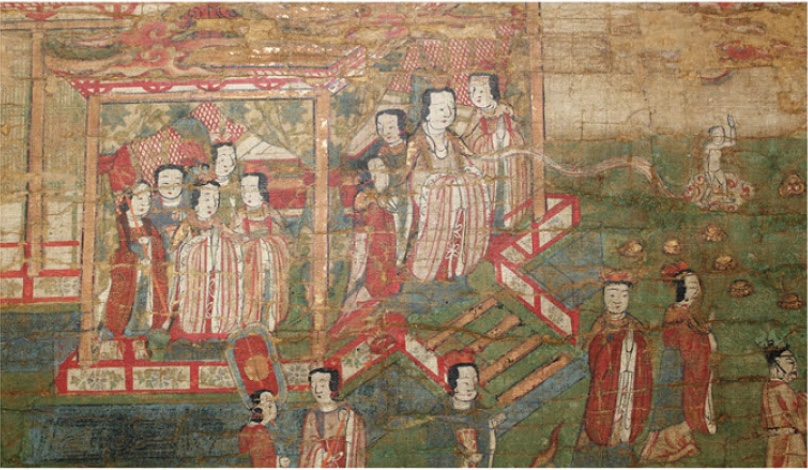
Detail of Mani's Birth, showing the newborn emerged from the chest of his mother

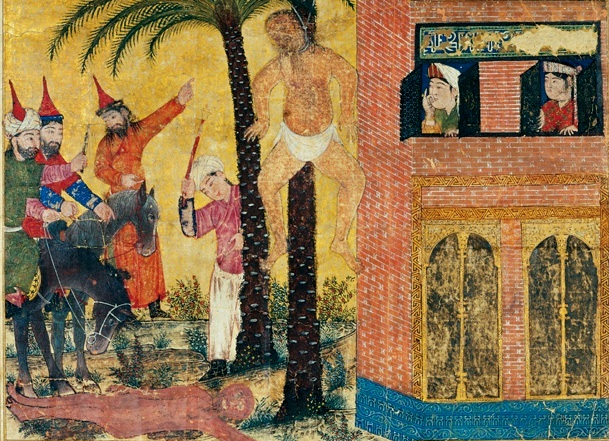
The execution of Mani as depicted in a 14th century illustration of the Shahnameh

This work and other evidence discovered in the 20th century establish Mani as a historical individual. For an updated critique of the standard account and a radically alternative proposal, see Iain Gardner's The Founder of Manichaeism: Rethinking the Life of Mani.

=== Early life ===
Mani was born near Seleucia-Ctesiphon, perhaps in the town of Mardinu in the Babylonian district of Nahr Kutha; according to other accounts in the town Abrumya. Mani's father Pātik (Middle Persian: Pattūg; Koine Greek: Παττικιος, Arabic: Futtuq), a native of Ecbatana (now Hamadan, Iran), was a member of the Jewish Christian sect of the Elcesaites, having joined their sect upon attending a temple in Ctesiphon, and hearing a voice tell him “Pattig! Do not eat meat, do not drink wine and abstain from intercourse with anyone.” He heard this call repeated many times over three days, and upon joining the sect, he took Mani, who at that time was four years old, with him. His mother was of Parthian descent (from "the Armenian Arsacid family of Kamsarakan"); her name is reported variously, among others Maryam. Mani was closely related on his mother's side to the famous Parthian ruling dynasty, the Arsacids.

Mani was raised in a heterodox environment in Babylon. The Elcesaite community was ostensibly Jewish Christian, though with some Gnostic features due to their Ebionite heritage, such as the belief in recurring incarnations of heavenly apostles, one of whom was a docetic Christ. It is believed that his Christian roots might have been influenced by Marcion and Bardaisan. At ages 12 and 24 Mani had visionary experiences of a "heavenly twin" of his (syzygos), calling him to leave his father's sect and preach the true message of Jesus in a new gospel. It is said that his appearance was a mixture of Iranian and Mesopotamian features. On the one hand he looked like a warrior, on the other like a magician. In some later texts he was described as lame, a characteristic possibly attributed to him by his opponents. Mani was either expelled, or withdrew from his community after he purported to receive his revelations.

=== Travelling to India ===
Mani then travelled to India (Sakas in present-day Afghanistan), where he studied Hinduism and its various extant philosophies, as well as Buddhism. Al-Biruni says Mani only traveled to India after being banished from Persia, but this might be an error or a second journey.

=== Return from India ===
Returning in 242, Mani presented himself to Shapur I, to whom he dedicated his only work written in Persian, known as the Shabuhragan. Shapur was not converted to Manichaeism and remained Zoroastrian, but he favored Mani's teachings, which mixed Christianity, Buddhism and Zoroastrianism, and took him into his court. Mani is said to have performed miracles, including levitation, teleporting and healing, which helped him to gain converts in the Iranian elite. He was also famed as a painter.

=== Imprisonment and execution ===
Shapur's successor Hormizd I, who reigned only for one year, continued to patronize Mani, but his successor Bahram I, a follower of the intolerant Zoroastrian reformer Kartir, began to persecute the Manichaeans. He incarcerated Mani, who died in prison within a month, in 274. According to sources, he passed his last days comforting his visiting disciples, teaching that his death would have no other consequence than the return of his soul to the realm of light.

A Parthian-language fragment from the Manichaean Turpan documents about the death of Mani in the city of Bēlābād (Gundeshapur), in Sasanian Khuzistan.

Mani's followers depicted Mani's death as a crucifixion in a conscious analogy to the crucifixion of Jesus; al-Biruni says that Bahram ordered the execution of Mani. There is a story which claims that he was flayed, and his corpse suspended over the main gate of the great city of Gundeshapur; however, it is more plausible that his body was mutilated via post-mortem decapitation, and his head put on display, which may be the original source of the embellishment.

== Works ==
The canon of Mani includes six works originally written in Syriac, and one in Persian, the Shapuragan. While none of his books have survived in complete form, there are numerous fragments and quotations of them, including a long Syriac quotation from one of his works, as well as a large amount of material in Middle Persian, Coptic, and numerous other languages.

Examples of surviving portions of his works include: the Shabuhragan (Middle Persian), the Book of Giants (numerous fragments in many languages), the Fundamental Epistle (quoted in length by Saint Augustine), a number of fragments of his Living Gospel (or Great Gospel), a Syriac excerpt quoted by Theodore Bar Konai, and his Letter to Edessa contained in the Cologne Mani-Codex. Mani also wrote the book Arzhang, a holy book of Manichaeism unique in that it contained many drawings and paintings to express and explain the Manichaeist creation and history of the world.

== Teaching ==
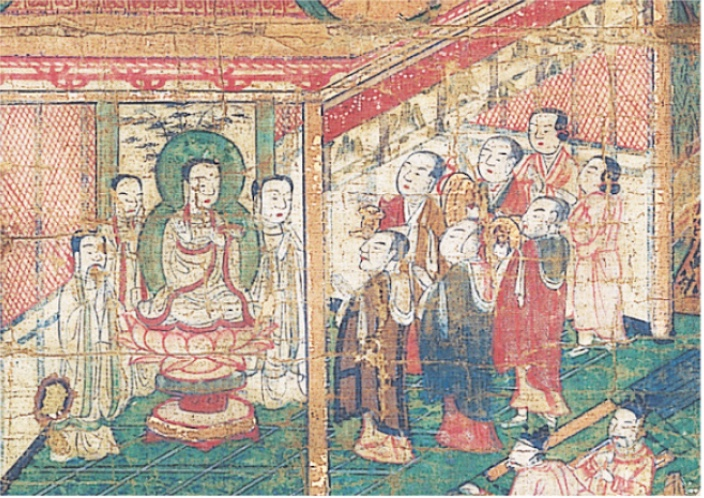
Detail of Mani's Community Established, depicting seven lay people bringing offerings to shrine with statue of Mani and three elects

Mani's teaching was intended to "combine", succeed, and surpass the teachings of Christianity, Zoroastrianism, Buddhism, Marcionism, Hellenistic and Rabbinic Judaism, Gnostic movements, Babylonian and other Mesopotamian religions, and mystery cults. It is based on a rigid dualism of good and evil, locked in eternal struggle, which was a "familiar mytholog[ical]" element of the time in many spiritual traditions that Mani deliberately borrowed.

In his mid-twenties, Mani decided that salvation was possible through education, self-denial, fasting and chastity. According to al-Biruni, a 10th-century Iranian scholar, Mani claimed to be the Paraclete promised in the New Testament, and the Last Prophet. However, according to Lodewijk J. R. Ort, the term last prophet may "in all probability derived from the Quran by al-Biruni in order to formulate Mani's pretensions and religious claims". Therefore, Lodewijk J. R. Ort concludes that a definitive pronouncement about the final character of Mani's appearance is not mentioned in Manichaean scriptures.

While his religion was not strictly a movement of Christian Gnosticism in the earlier mode, Mani did declare himself to be an "apostle of Jesus Christ", and extant Manichaean poetry frequently extols Jesus and his mother, Mary, with the highest reverence. Manichaean tradition also claims that Mani was the reincarnation of different religious figures including Jesus, Zoroaster, and the historical Buddha.

Mani's followers were organized in a church structure, divided into a class of "elects" (electi) and "auditors" (auditores). Only the electi are required to follow the laws strictly, while the auditores care for them, hoping to become electi in their turn after reincarnation.

== Christian and Islamic tradition ==
=== Late Antique Christian accounts in the West ===
The Western Christian tradition of Mani largely comes from St. Cyril of Jerusalem. According to his account, Scythianos, a Saracen, who dwelt in Alexandria and "imitated the life of Aristotle, wrote four books, the first, a Gospel, the second, a book of Chapters, the third a book of Mysteries, and the fourth, a book of Treasure. When Scythianos went to Palestine, God killed him with a disease. However, Scythianos had a disciple, Terebinthus, who travelled to Persia, where he changed his name to Buddas. While he was there, he angered the priests of Mithras, so he took refuge with a widow, he went to the rooftops and summoned the "demons of the air", he was then smote by God, and the widow buried his corpse.

The woman at whose house he lodged buried him, inherited his money, and bought a slave boy named Cubricus. This boy grew up surrounded by philosophers, and when his adoptive mother died, he inherited the surviving books of Scythianos, then travelled into Persia, where he took the name of Manes.

According to Jerome, Archelaus wrote his account of his disputation with "Manichaeus" in Syriac, whence it was translated into Greek. The Greek is lost, and the work, apart from extracts, subsists only in a Latin translation from the Greek, of doubtful age and fidelity, probably made after the 5th century. By Photius it is stated that Heraclean, bishop of Chalcedon, in his book against the Manichaeans, said the Disputation of Archelaus was written by one Hegemonius, an author not otherwise traceable, and of unknown date.

In the Latin narrative, "Manes" is said to have come, after his flight from court, from Arabion, a frontier fortress, to Caschar or Carchar, a town said to be in Roman Mesopotamia, in the hope of converting an eminent Christian there, named Marcellus, to whom he had sent a letter beginning: "Manichaeus apostle of Jesus Christ, and all the saints and virgins with me, send peace to Marcellus." In his train he brought twenty-two youths and virgins.

At the request of Marcellus, he debated on religion with bishop Archelaus, by whom he was vanquished, whereupon he set out to return to Persia. On his way he proposed to debate with a priest at the town of Diodorides. But Archelaus came to take the priest's place, and again defeated him, whereupon, fearing to be given up to the Persians by the Christians, he returned to Arabion.

At this stage Archelaus introduces in a discourse to the people his history of "this Manes", much to the effect of the recapitulation in Socrates. Among the further details are these: that Scythianus lived "in the time of the Apostles", that Terebinthus said the name of Buddas had been imposed on him, that in the mountains he had been brought up by an angel, and that a Persian prophet named Parcus, and Labdacus, son of Mithras, had accused him of being a liar and argued with him frequently.

Furthermore, that in the disputation he taught concerning the sphere, the two luminaries, the transmigration of souls, and the war of the Principia against God, that "Corbicius", about the age of sixty, translated the books of Terebinthus. He made three chief disciples, Thomas, Addas, and Hermas, of whom he sent the first to Egypt, and the second to Scythia, keeping the third with him. The two former returned when he was in prison, and that he sent them to procure for him the books of the Christians, which he then studied. According to the Latin narrative, finally, Manes on his return to Arabion was seized and taken to the Persian king, by whose orders he was flayed, his body being left to the birds, and his skin hung at the city gate.

=== Medieval Islamic accounts ===
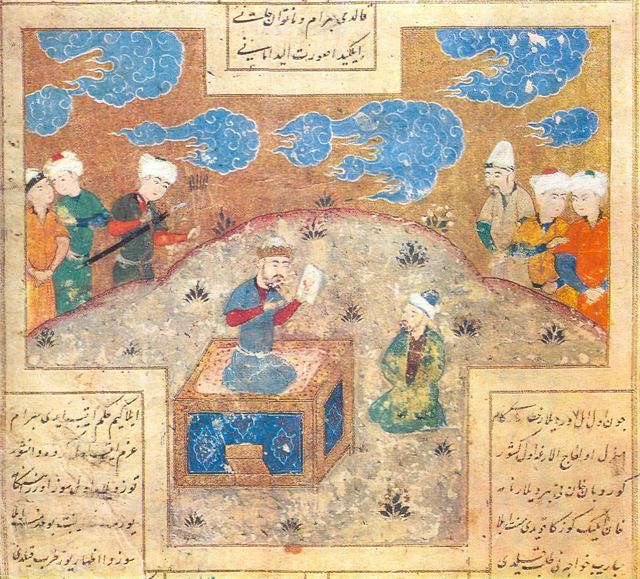
Painter Mani presenting king Bukhram-Gur (Bahram) with his drawing. 16th-century painting by Ali-Shir Nava'i, Shakrukhia (Tashkent).

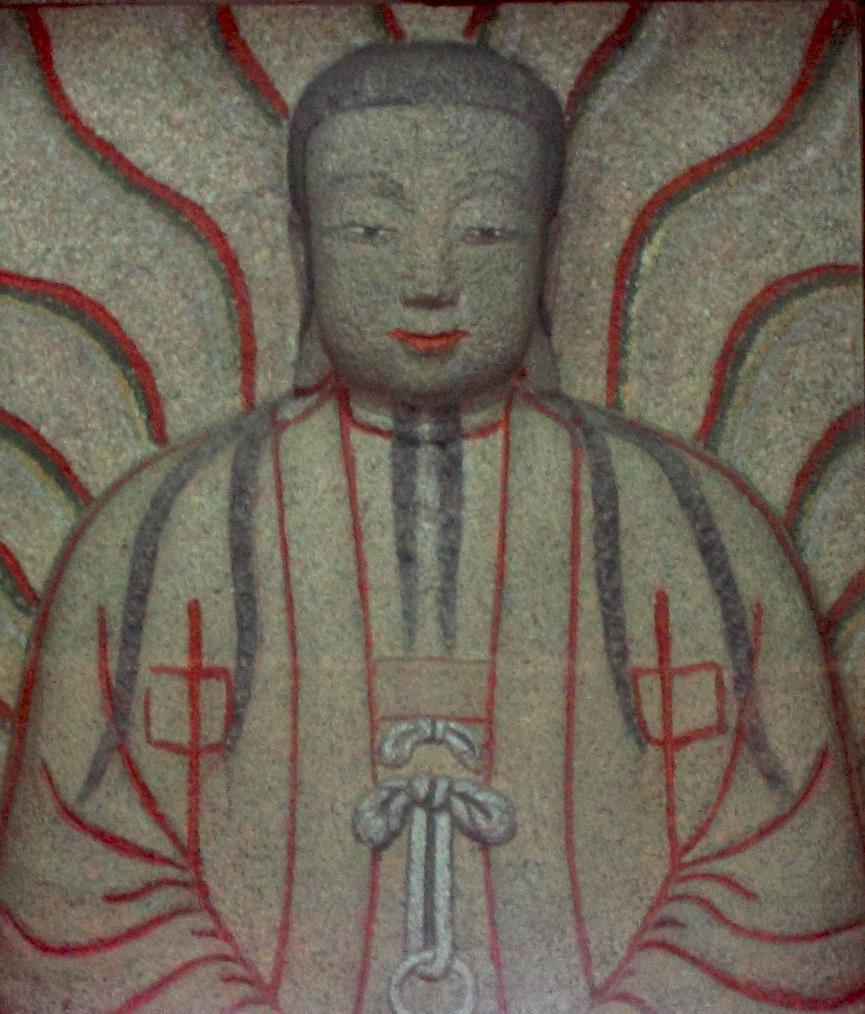
Statue of Mani in the Cao'an temple, China

Ya'qubi reports that Mani convinced Shapur I to convert to Manichaeism, and that Shapur was a Manichean for 10 years, and forced it upon the populace, until a Zoroastrian mobedh convinced Shapur to hold a debate between Mani and the Zoroastrian clergy, which Mani lost, causing Shapur to revert to Zoroastrianism. Mani then fled to India to avoid execution, where he remained until Shapur died. Afterwards, the Manicheans noted that Shapur's successor, Hormizd I, had died and been replaced by his elder brother, Bahram I, who was preoccupied. This convinced Mani to return to Persia. Bahram then learned where Mani was, and had him summoned to the court, where the Mobedh said "Let him melt lead for me and for you and pour (it) on my stomach and on your stomach, and whichever one of us is unhurt by this (ordeal), he will be correct." Mani protested, arguing that what the Mobedh had suggested was a "deed of darkness", so Bahram had Mani arrested instead, and then in the night, had Mani flayed, his body stuffed with straw, and then beheaded him. According to Al-Tha'alibi, Bahram I had the mobedhs debate Mani, after Mani said that destroying the body was productive to the spirit, Bahram responded by saying "‘We will start with the destruction of your body and deal with you in accordance with what you teach!" Mani was then skinned alive, his skin was filled with straw, and suspended over one of the gates of Jundaysābūr. Afterwards, 12,000 Manichaeans were put to death.

== See also ==
- Mar Ammo
- Arzhang
- Cologne Mani-Codex
- The Gardens of Light
- Gospel of Mani
- Mandaeism

== Sources ==
- Asmussen, Jes Peter, comp., Manichaean Literature: Representative Texts, Chiefly from Middle Persian and Parthian Writings, 1975, Scholars' Facsimiles & Reprints, ISBN 978-0-8201-1141-4. Link
- Alexander Böhlig, 'Manichäismus' in: Theologische Realenzyklopädie 22 (1992), 25–45.
- Griffith, Sidney H. (2002). "Christianity in Edessa and the Syriac-Speaking World: Mani, Bar Daysan, and Ephraem, the Struggle for Allegiance on the Aramean Frontier". Journal of the Canadian Society for Syriac Studies. 2: 5–20. doi:10.31826/jcsss-2009-020104. S2CID 212688584. Archived from the original on 2019-09-10.
- Amin Maalouf, The Gardens of Light [Les Jardins de Lumière], translated from French by Dorothy S. Blair, 242 p. (Interlink Publishing Group, New York, 2007). ISBN 1-56656-248-1
- Mitchell, Charles W., ed. (1912). S. Ephraim's Prose Refutations of Mani, Marcion, and Bardaisan. Vol. 1. London: Text and Translation Society.
- Mitchell, Charles W.; Bevan, Anthony A.; Burkitt, Francis C., eds. (1921). S. Ephraim's Prose Refutations of Mani, Marcion, and Bardaisan. Vol. 2. London: Text and Translation Society.
