= Religion =

Social-cultural system

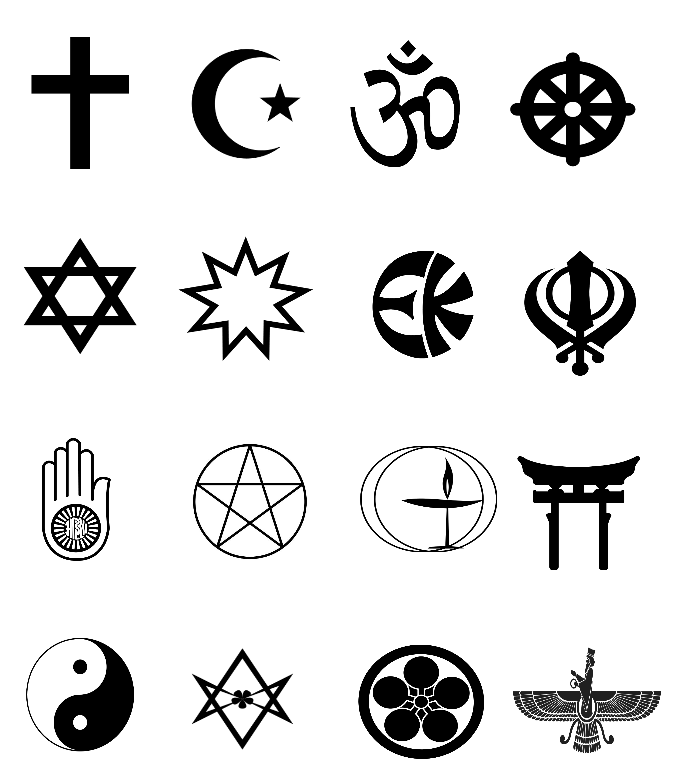
Religious symbols from left to right, top to bottom: Christianity, Islam, Hinduism, Buddhism, Judaism, the Baháʼí Faith, Eckankar, Sikhism, Jainism, Wicca, Unitarian Universalism, Shinto, Taoism, Thelema, Tenrikyo, and Zoroastrianism

Religion is a range of social-cultural systems, including designated behaviors and practices, ethics, morals, beliefs, worldviews, texts, sanctified places, prophecies, or organizations, that generally relate humanity to supernatural, transcendental, and spiritual elements—although there is no scholarly consensus over what precisely constitutes a religion. It is an essentially contested concept. Different religions may or may not contain various elements ranging from the divine, sacredness, faith, or a supernatural being or beings; religions that lack these elements may be identified as secular religions.

The origin of religious belief is an open question, with possible explanations including awareness of individual death, a sense of community, and dreams. Religions have sacred histories, narratives, and mythologies, preserved in oral traditions, sacred texts, symbols, and holy places, that may attempt to explain the origin of life, the universe, and other phenomena. Religious practice may include rituals, sermons, commemoration or veneration (of deities or saints), sacrifices, festivals, feasts, trances, initiations, matrimonial and funerary services, meditation, prayer, music, art, dance, or public service.

There are an estimated 10,000 distinct religions worldwide, though nearly all of them have regionally based and relatively small followings. Four religions—Christianity, Islam, Hinduism, and Buddhism—account for over 73% of the world's population, and 97.6% of the world either follows one of those four religions or identifies as nonreligious, meaning that all remaining religions combined account for only 2.4% of the population. The religiously unaffiliated demographic includes those who do not identify with any particular religion, atheists, and agnostics, although many in the demographic still have various religious beliefs. Many world religions are also organized religions, including the Abrahamic religions (Christianity, Islam, Judaism, and the Baháʼí Faith), while others are arguably less so, in particular folk religions, indigenous religions, and some Eastern religions. A portion of the world's population are members of new religious movements. Scholars have indicated that global religiosity may be increasing due to religious countries having generally higher birth rates.

The study of religion comprises a wide variety of academic disciplines, including theology, philosophy of religion, comparative religion, and social scientific studies. Theories about religion offer various explanations for its origins and workings, including the ontological foundations of religious being and belief.

== Etymology and history of the concept of "religion" ==
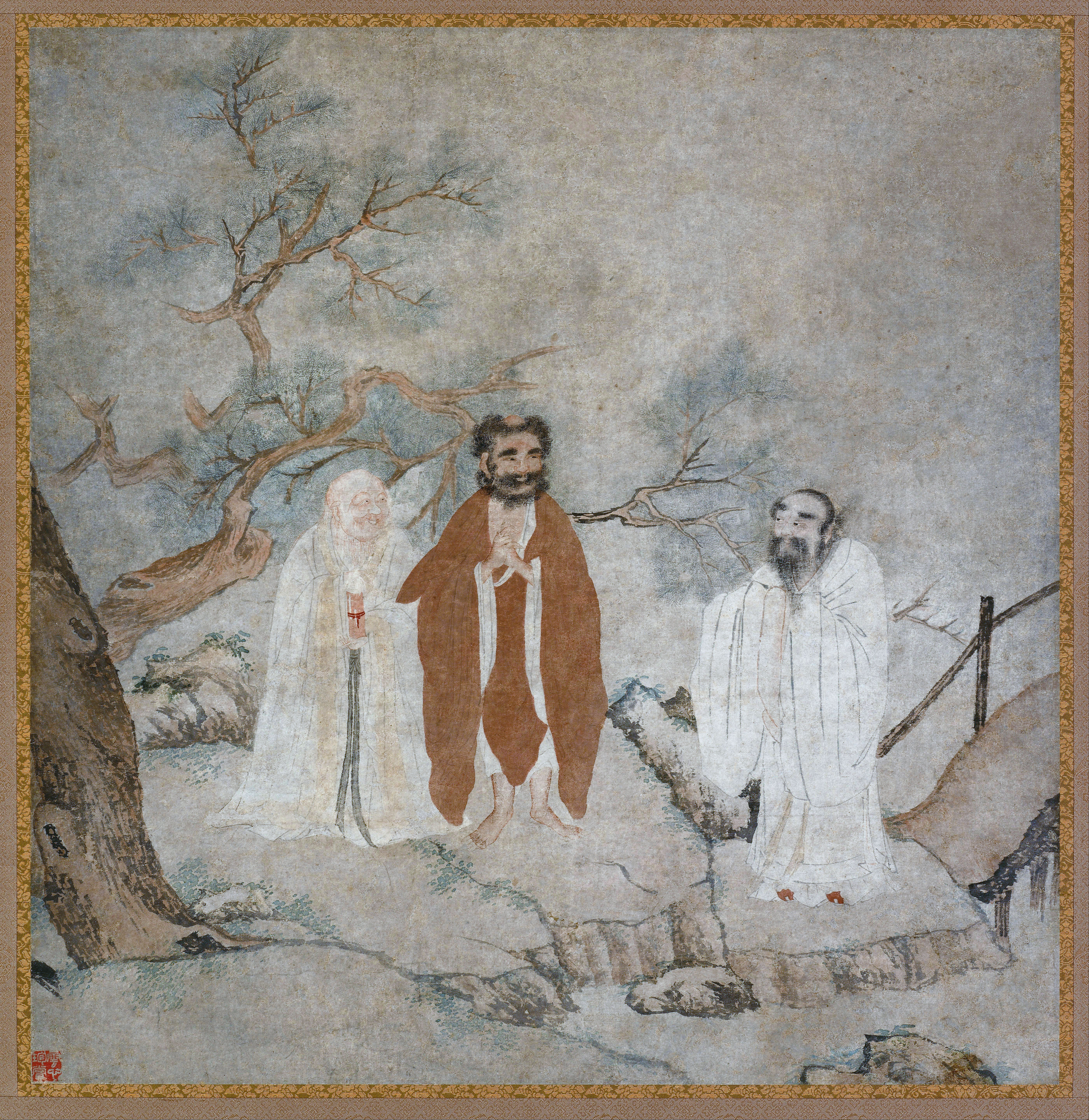
The Buddha, Laozi, and Confucius – founders of Buddhism, Taoism (Daoism) and Confucianism – in a Ming dynasty painting

=== Etymology ===
The term religion comes from both Old French and Anglo-Norman (circ. 1200s CE) and means respect for sense of right, moral obligation, sanctity, what is sacred, reverence for the gods. It is ultimately derived from the Latin word religiō. According to Roman philosopher Cicero, religiō comes from relegere: re (meaning 'again') + lego (meaning 'read'), where lego is in the sense of 'go over', 'choose', or 'consider carefully'. Contrarily, some modern scholars such as Tom Harpur and Joseph Campbell have argued that religiō is derived from religare: re (meaning 'again') + ligare ('bind' or 'connect'), which was made prominent by St. Augustine following the interpretation given by Lactantius in Divinae institutiones, IV, 28. The medieval usage alternates with order in designating bonded communities like those of monastic orders: "we hear of the 'religion' of the Golden Fleece, of a knight 'of the religion of Avys'."

==== Religiō ====
In classic antiquity, religiō broadly meant conscientiousness, sense of right, moral obligation, or duty to anything. Religio was originally not related to gods in antiquity nor was it referring to a social or cultural phenomenon. In the ancient and medieval world, the etymological Latin root religiō was understood as an individual virtue of worship in mundane contexts; never as doctrine, practice, or actual source of knowledge. In general, religiō referred to broad social obligations towards anything including family, neighbors, rulers, and even towards God. Religiō was most often used by the ancient Romans not in the context of a relation towards gods, but as a range of general emotions which arose from heightened attention in any mundane context such as hesitation, caution, anxiety, or fear, as well as feelings of being bound, restricted, or inhibited. The term was also closely related to other terms like scrupulus (which meant "very precisely"), and some Roman authors related the term superstitio (which meant too much fear or anxiety or shame) to religiō at times. When religiō came into English around the 1200s as religion, it took the meaning of "life bound by monastic vows" or monastic orders. The compartmentalized concept of religion, where religious and worldly things were separated, was not used before the 1500s. The concept of religion was first used in the 1500s to distinguish the domain of the church and the domain of civil authorities; the Peace of Augsburg marks such an instance, which has been described by Christian Reus-Smit as "the first step on the road toward a European system of sovereign states."

Roman general Julius Caesar used religiō to mean 'obligation of an oath' when discussing captured soldiers making an oath to their captors. Roman naturalist Pliny the Elder used the term religiō to describe the apparent respect given by elephants to the night sky. Cicero used religiō as being related to cultum deorum (worship of the gods).

==== Threskeia ====
In Ancient Greece, the Greek term threskeia (θρησκεία) was loosely translated into Latin as religiō in late antiquity. Threskeia was sparsely used in classical Greece but became more frequently used in the writings of Josephus in the 1st century CE. It was used in mundane contexts and could mean multiple things from respectful fear to excessive or harmfully distracting practices of others, to cultic practices. It was often contrasted with the Greek word deisidaimonia, which meant too much fear.

=== History of the concept of "religion" ===
Religion is a modern concept and not a universal concept across history, cultures or languages. The concept was invented recently in the English language and is found in texts from the 17th century due to events such as the splitting of Christendom during the Protestant Reformation and globalization in the Age of Exploration, which involved contact with numerous foreign cultures with non-European languages. Some argue that regardless of its definition, it is not appropriate to apply the term religion to non-Western cultures, while some followers of various faiths rebuke using the word to describe their own belief system. Many cultures around the world lack or reject distinctions between the natural and supernatural.

The concept of "ancient religion" stems from modern interpretations of a range of practices that conform to a modern concept of religion, influenced by early modern and 19th century Christian discourse. The concept of religion was formed in the 16th and 17th centuries, despite the fact that ancient sacred texts like the Bible, the Quran, and others did not have a word or even a concept of religion in the original languages and neither did the people or the cultures in which these sacred texts were written. For example, there is no precise equivalent of religion in Hebrew, and Judaism does not distinguish clearly between religious, national, racial, or ethnic identities. One of its central concepts is halakha, meaning the walk or path sometimes translated as law, which guides religious practice and belief and many aspects of daily life. Even though the beliefs and traditions of Judaism are found in the ancient world, ancient Jews saw Jewish identity as being about an ethnic or national identity and did not entail a compulsory belief system or regulated rituals. In the 1st century CE, Josephus had used the Greek term ioudaismos (Judaism) as an ethnic term and was not linked to modern abstract concepts of religion or a set of beliefs. The very concept of "Judaism" was invented by the Christian Church, and it was in the 19th century that Jews began to see their ancestral culture as a religion analogous to Christianity. The Greek word threskeia, which was used by Greek writers such as Herodotus and Josephus, is found in the New Testament. Threskeia is sometimes translated as "religion" in today's translations, but the term was understood as generic "worship" well into the medieval period. In the Quran, the Arabic word din is often translated as religion in modern translations, but up to the mid-1600s translators expressed din as "law." According to the Encyclopaedia of the Qur'ān, prior to the 20th century, "English word "religion" had no direct equivalent in Arabic nor had the Arabic word dīn in English".

The Sanskrit word dharma, sometimes translated as religion, also means law. Throughout classical South Asia, the study of law consisted of concepts such as penance through piety and ceremonial as well as practical traditions. Medieval Japan at first had a similar union between imperial law and universal or Buddha law, but these later became independent sources of power.

Though traditions, sacred texts, and practices have existed throughout time, most cultures did not align with Western conceptions of religion since they did not separate everyday life from the sacred. In the 18th and 19th centuries, the terms Buddhism, Hinduism, Taoism, Confucianism, and world religions first entered the English language. Native Americans were also thought of as not having religions and also had no word for religion in their languages either. No one self-identified as a Hindu or Buddhist or other similar terms before the 1800s. "Hindu" has historically been used as a geographical, cultural, and later religious identifier for people indigenous to the Indian subcontinent. Throughout its long history, Japan had no concept of religion since there was no corresponding Japanese word, nor anything close to its meaning, but when American warships appeared off the coast of Japan in 1853 and forced the Japanese government to sign treaties demanding, among other things, freedom of religion, the country had to contend with this idea.

According to the philologist Max Müller in the 19th century, the root of the English word religion, the Latin religiō, was originally used to mean only reverence for God or the gods, careful pondering of divine things, piety (which Cicero further derived to mean diligence). Müller characterized many other cultures around the world, including Egypt, Persia, and India, as having a similar power structure at this point in history. What is called ancient religion today, they would have only called law.

==== History of "nonreligion" and "secular" ====
Accordingly, other concepts like the "secular", "nonreligion", and "atheism" have been called into question since they are, like religion, not universal concepts as they are not found in many other cultures. Anthropologically, this is also the case where Western terms and concepts like "religion" and "secular" do not exist in other cultures. Sociologists and demographers have noted that outside the West, concepts of "religion" or "the secular" are not always rooted in local culture and may not even be present. Other studies indicate that religion and nonreligion are not necessarily mutually exclusive experiences since there is overlap in individuals regular lives.

== Definition ==
Scholars have failed to agree on a definition of religion. There are, however, two general definition systems: the sociological/functional and the phenomenological/philosophical.

=== Modern Western ===
The concept of religion originated in the modern era in the West. Parallel concepts are not found in many current and past cultures; there is no equivalent term for religion in many languages. Scholars have found it difficult to develop a consistent definition, with some giving up on the possibility of a definition. Others argue that regardless of its definition, it is not appropriate to apply it to non-Western cultures.

An increasing number of scholars have expressed reservations about ever defining the essence of religion. They observe that the way the concept today is used is a particularly modern construct that would not have been understood through much of history and in many cultures outside the West (or even in the West until after the Peace of Westphalia). The MacMillan Encyclopedia of Religions states:

The very attempt to define religion, to find some distinctive or possibly unique essence or set of qualities that distinguish the religious from the remainder of human life, is primarily a Western concern. The attempt is a natural consequence of the Western speculative, intellectualistic, and scientific disposition. It is also the product of the dominant Western religious mode, what is called the Judeo-Christian climate or, more accurately, the theistic inheritance from Judaism, Christianity, and Islam. The theistic form of belief in this tradition, even when downgraded culturally, is formative of the dichotomous Western view of religion. That is, the basic structure of theism is essentially a distinction between a transcendent deity and all else, between the creator and his creation, between God and man.

The anthropologist Clifford Geertz defined religion as a:

... system of symbols which acts to establish powerful, pervasive, and long-lasting moods and motivations in men by formulating conceptions of a general order of existence and clothing these conceptions with such an aura of factuality that the moods and motivations seem uniquely realistic.

Alluding perhaps to Tylor's "deeper motive", Geertz remarked that:

... we have very little idea of how, in empirical terms, this particular miracle is accomplished. We just know that it is done, annually, weekly, daily, for some people almost hourly; and we have an enormous ethnographic literature to demonstrate it.

The theologian Antoine Vergote took the term supernatural simply to mean whatever transcends the powers of nature or human agency. He also emphasized the cultural reality of religion, which he defined as:

... the entirety of the linguistic expressions, emotions and, actions and signs that refer to a supernatural being or supernatural beings.

Peter Mandaville and Paul James intended to get away from the modernist dualisms or dichotomous understandings of immanence/transcendence, spirituality/materialism, and sacredness/secularity. They define religion as:

... a relatively-bounded system of beliefs, symbols and practices that addresses the nature of existence, and in which communion with others and Otherness is lived as if it both takes in and spiritually transcends socially-grounded ontologies of time, space, embodiment and knowing.

According to the MacMillan Encyclopedia of Religions, there is an experiential aspect to religion which can be found in almost every culture:

... almost every known culture [has] a depth dimension in cultural experiences ... toward some sort of ultimacy and transcendence that will provide norms and power for the rest of life. When more or less distinct patterns of behavior are built around this depth dimension in a culture, this structure constitutes religion in its historically recognizable form. Religion is the organization of life around the depth dimensions of experience—varied in form, completeness, and clarity in accordance with the environing culture.

Anthropologists Lyle Steadman and Craig T. Palmer emphasized the communication of supernatural beliefs, defining religion as:

... the communicated acceptance by individuals of another individual's "supernatural" claim, a claim whose accuracy is not verifiable by the senses.

=== Classical ===
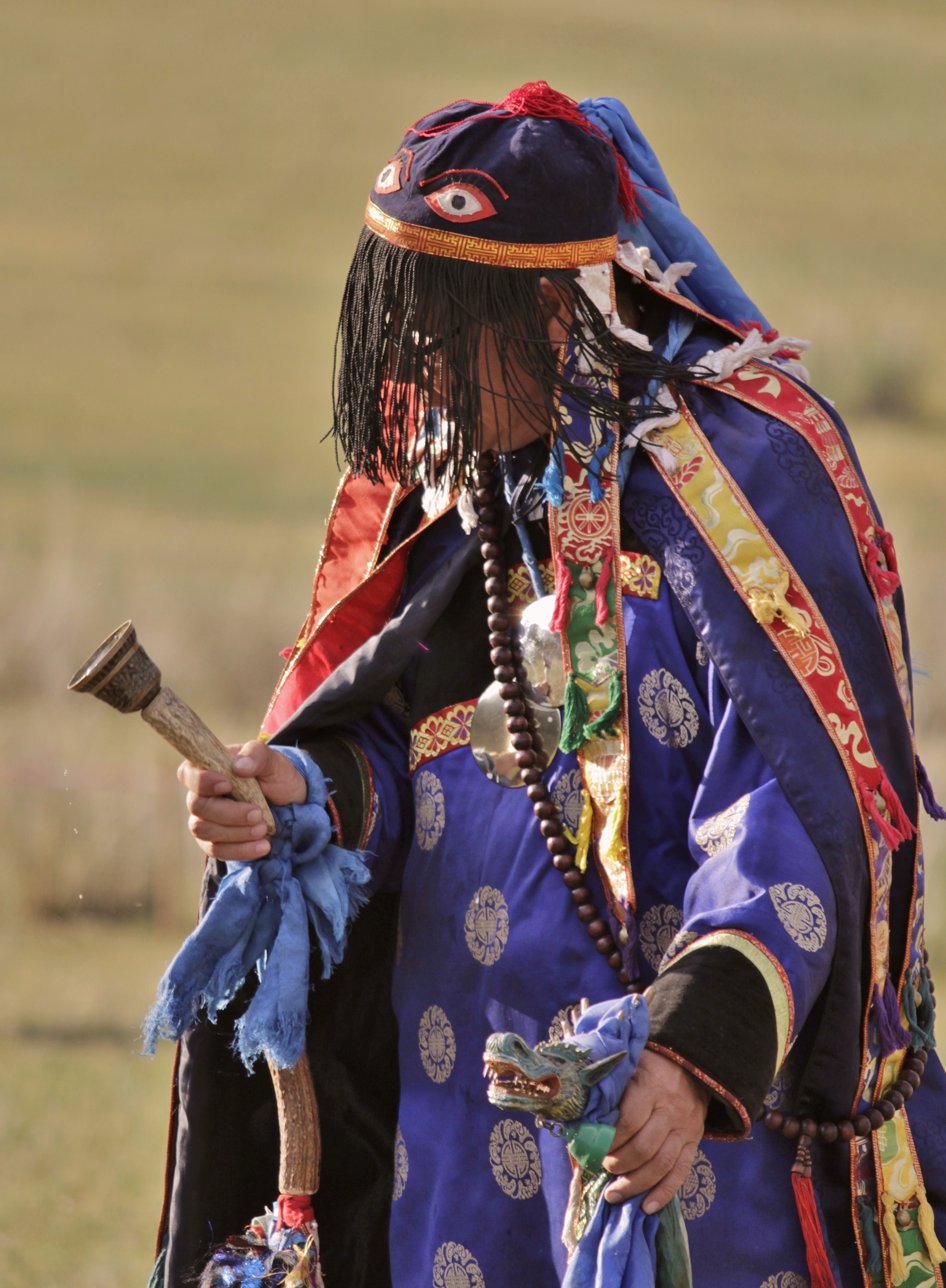
Budazhap Shiretorov (Будажап Цыреторов), the head shaman of the religious community Altan Serge (Алтан Сэргэ) in Buryatia

Friedrich Schleiermacher in the late 18th century defined religion as das schlechthinnige Abhängigkeitsgefühl, commonly translated as "the feeling of absolute dependence".

His contemporary Georg Wilhelm Friedrich Hegel disagreed thoroughly, defining religion as "the Divine Spirit becoming conscious of Himself through the finite spirit."

Edward Burnett Tylor defined religion in 1871 as "the belief in spiritual beings". He argued that narrowing the definition to mean the belief in a supreme deity or judgment after death or idolatry and so on, would exclude many peoples from the category of religious, and thus "has the fault of identifying religion rather with particular developments than with the deeper motive which underlies them." He also argued that the belief in spiritual beings exists in all known societies.

In his book The Varieties of Religious Experience, the psychologist William James defined religion as "the feelings, acts, and experiences of individual men in their solitude, so far as they apprehend themselves to stand in relation to whatever they may consider the divine." By the term divine James meant "any object that is godlike, whether it be a concrete deity or not" to which the individual feels impelled to respond with solemnity and gravity.

Sociologist Émile Durkheim, in his seminal book The Elementary Forms of the Religious Life, defined religion as a "unified system of beliefs and practices relative to sacred things". By sacred things he meant things "set apart and forbidden—beliefs and practices which unite into one single moral community called a Church, all those who adhere to them." Sacred things are not, however, limited to gods or spirits. (Note: That is how, according to Durkheim, Buddhism is a religion. "In default of gods, Buddhism admits the existence of sacred things, namely, the four noble truths and the practices derived from them" Durkheim 1915) On the contrary, a sacred thing can be "a rock, a tree, a spring, a pebble, a piece of wood, a house, in a word, anything can be sacred." Religious beliefs, myths, dogmas and legends are the representations that express the nature of these sacred things, and the virtues and powers which are attributed to them.

Echoes of James' and Durkheim's definitions are to be found in the writings of, for example, Frederick Ferré who defined religion as "one's way of valuing most comprehensively and intensively". Similarly, for the theologian Paul Tillich, faith is "the state of being ultimately concerned", which "is itself religion. Religion is the substance, the ground, and the depth of man's spiritual life."

When religion is seen in terms of sacred, divine, intensive valuing, or ultimate concern, then it is possible to understand why scientific findings and philosophical criticisms (e.g., those made by Richard Dawkins) do not necessarily disturb its adherents.

== Aspects ==
=== Beliefs ===
The origin of religious belief is an open question, with possible explanations including awareness of individual death, a sense of community, and dreams. Traditionally, faith, in addition to reason, has been considered a source of religious beliefs. The interplay between faith and reason, and their use as perceived support for religious beliefs, have been a subject of interest to philosophers and theologians.

=== Mythology ===
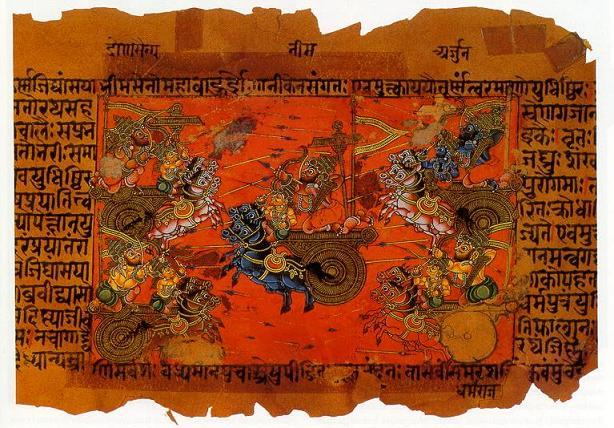
A manuscript depicting the climactic Kurukshetra War in Hindu epic Mahabharata. The Mahabharata is the longest epic poem known and a key source of Hindu mythology.

The word myth has several meanings:

1. A traditional story of ostensibly historical events that serves to unfold part of the world view of a people or explain a practice, belief, or natural phenomenon;
2. A person or thing having only an imaginary or unverifiable existence; or
3. A metaphor for the spiritual potentiality in the human being.

Ancient polytheistic religions, such as those of Greece, Rome, and Scandinavia, are usually categorized under the heading of mythology. Religions of pre-industrial peoples, or cultures in development, are similarly called myths in the anthropology of religion. The term myth can be used pejoratively by both religious and non-religious people. By defining another person's religious stories and beliefs as mythology, one implies that they are less real or true than one's own religious stories and beliefs. Joseph Campbell remarked, "Mythology is often thought of as other people's religions, and religion can be defined as misinterpreted mythology."

In sociology, however, the term myth has a non-pejorative meaning. There, myth is defined as a story that is important for the group, whether or not it is objectively or provably true. Examples include the resurrection of their real-life founder Jesus, which, to Christians, explains the means by which they are freed from sin, is symbolic of the power of life over death, and is also said to be a historical event. But from a mythological outlook, whether or not the event actually occurred is unimportant. Instead, the symbolism of the death of an old life and the start of a new life is most significant. Religious believers may or may not accept such symbolic interpretations.

=== Practices ===
The practices of a religion may include rituals, sermons, commemoration or veneration of a deity (god or goddess), sacrifices, festivals, feasts, trances, initiations, funerary services, matrimonial services, meditation, prayer, religious music, religious art, sacred dance, public service, or other aspects of human culture. Barriers to exit a religion vary, ranging from freedom of religion to death for apostasy, which can result in coercion through deterrence.

=== Social organisation ===
Religions have a societal basis, either as a living tradition which is carried by lay participants, or with an organized clergy, and a definition of what constitutes adherence or membership.

== Academic study ==
A number of disciplines study the phenomenon of religion: theology, comparative religion, history of religion, evolutionary origin of religions, anthropology of religion, psychology of religion (including neuroscience of religion and evolutionary psychology of religion), law and religion, and sociology of religion.

Daniel L. Pals mentions eight classical theories of religion, focusing on various aspects of religion: animism and magic, by E.B. Tylor and J.G. Frazer; the psycho-analytic approach of Sigmund Freud; and further Émile Durkheim, Karl Marx, Max Weber, Mircea Eliade, E.E. Evans-Pritchard, and Clifford Geertz.

Michael Stausberg gives an overview of contemporary theories of religion, including cognitive and biological approaches.

=== Theories ===
Sociological and anthropological theories of religion generally attempt to explain the origin and function of religion. These theories define what they present as universal characteristics of religious belief and practice.

==== Origins and development ====
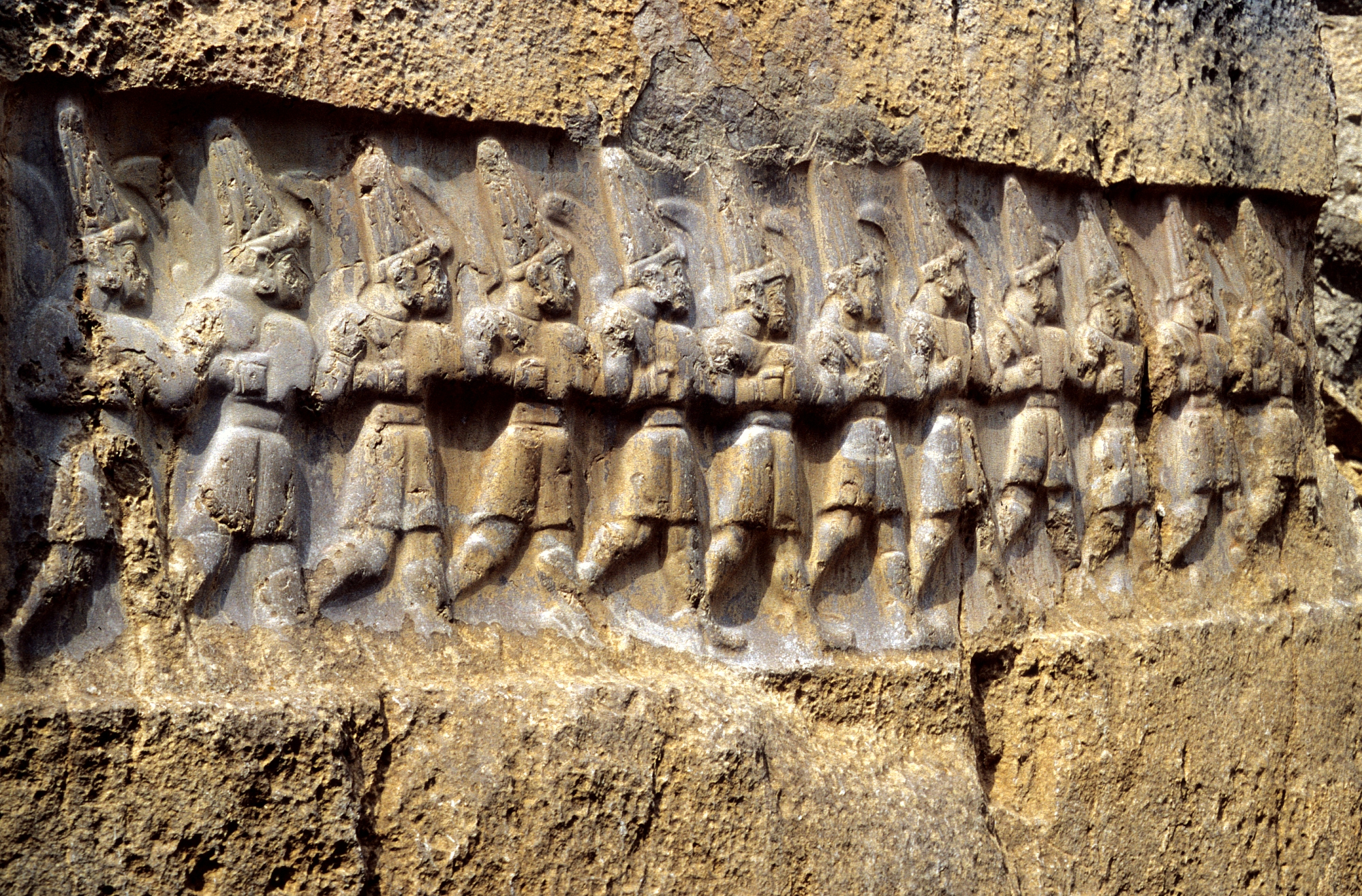
The Yazılıkaya sanctuary in Turkey, with the twelve gods of the underworld

The origin of religion is uncertain. There are a number of theories regarding the subsequent origins of religious practices.

According to anthropologists John Monaghan and Peter Just, "Many of the great world religions appear to have begun as revitalization movements of some sort, as the vision of a charismatic prophet fires the imaginations of people seeking a more comprehensive answer to their problems than they feel is provided by everyday beliefs. Charismatic individuals have emerged at many times and places in the world. It seems that the key to long-term success—and many movements come and go with little long-term effect—has relatively little to do with the prophets, who appear with surprising regularity, but more to do with the development of a group of supporters who are able to institutionalize the movement."

The development of religion has taken different forms in different cultures. Some religions place an emphasis on belief, while others emphasize practice. Some religions focus on the subjective experience of the religious individual, while others consider the activities of the religious community to be most important. Some religions claim to be universal, believing their laws and cosmology to be binding for everyone, while others are intended to be practiced only by a closely defined or localized group. In many places, religion has been associated with public institutions such as education, hospitals, the family, government, and political hierarchies.

Anthropologists John Monoghan and Peter Just state that, "it seems apparent that one thing religion or belief helps us do is deal with problems of human life that are significant, persistent, and intolerable. One important way in which religious beliefs accomplish this is by providing a set of ideas about how and why the world is put together that allows people to accommodate anxieties and deal with misfortune."

==== Cultural system ====
While religion is difficult to define, one standard model of religion, used in religious studies courses, was proposed by Clifford Geertz, who simply called it a "cultural system". A critique of Geertz's model by Talal Asad categorized religion as "an anthropological category". Richard Niebuhr's (1894–1962) five-fold classification of the relationship between Christ and culture, however, indicates that religion and culture can be seen as two separate systems, though with some interplay.

==== Social constructionism ====
One modern academic theory of religion, social constructionism, says that religion is a modern concept that suggests all spiritual practice and worship follows a model similar to the Abrahamic religions as an orientation system that helps to interpret reality and define human beings. Among the main proponents of this theory of religion are Daniel Dubuisson, Timothy Fitzgerald, Talal Asad, and Jason Ānanda Josephson. The social constructionists argue that religion is a modern concept that developed from Christianity and was then applied inappropriately to non-Western cultures.

==== Cognitive science ====
Cognitive science of religion is the study of religious thought and behavior from the perspective of the cognitive and evolutionary sciences. The field employs methods and theories from a very broad range of disciplines, including: cognitive psychology, evolutionary psychology, cognitive anthropology, artificial intelligence, cognitive neuroscience, neurobiology, zoology, and ethology. Scholars in this field seek to explain how human minds acquire, generate, and transmit religious thoughts, practices, and schemas by means of ordinary cognitive capacities.

Hallucinations and delusions related to religious content occurs in about 60% of people with schizophrenia. While this number varies across cultures, this had led to theories about a number of influential religious phenomena and possible relation to psychotic disorders. A number of prophetic experiences are consistent with psychotic symptoms, although retrospective diagnoses are practically impossible. Schizophrenic episodes are also experienced by people who do not have belief in gods.

Religious content is also common in temporal lobe epilepsy, and obsessive-compulsive disorder. Atheistic content is also found to be common with temporal lobe epilepsy.

=== Comparativism ===
Comparative religion is the branch of the study of religions concerned with the systematic comparison of the doctrines and practices of the world's religions. In general, the comparative study of religion yields a deeper understanding of the fundamental philosophical concerns of religion such as ethics, metaphysics, and the nature and form of salvation. Studying such material is meant to give one a richer and more sophisticated understanding of human beliefs and practices regarding the sacred, numinous, spiritual and divine.

In the field of comparative religion, a common geographical classification of the main world religions includes Middle Eastern religions (including Zoroastrianism and Iranian religions), Indian religions, East Asian religions, African religions, American religions, Oceanic religions, and classical Hellenistic religions.

== Classification ==
A map of major denominations and religions of the world

In the 19th and 20th centuries, the academic practice of comparative religion divided religious belief into philosophically defined categories called world religions. Some academics studying the subject have divided religions into three broad categories:

1. World religions, a term which refers to transcultural, international religions;
2. Indigenous religions, which refers to smaller, culture-specific or nation-specific religious groups; and
3. New religious movements, which refers to recently developed religions.

Some recent scholarship has argued that not all types of religion are necessarily separated by mutually exclusive philosophies, and furthermore that the utility of ascribing a practice to a certain philosophy, or even calling a given practice religious, rather than cultural, political, or social in nature, is limited. The current state of psychological study about the nature of religiousness suggests that it is better to refer to religion as a largely invariant phenomenon that should be distinguished from cultural norms (i.e. religions).

=== Morphological classification ===
Some religion scholars classify religions as either universal religions that seek worldwide acceptance and actively look for new converts, such as the Baháʼí Faith, Buddhism, Christianity, Islam, and Jainism, while ethnic religions are identified with a particular ethnic group and do not seek converts. Others reject the distinction, saying that all religious practices, whatever their philosophical origin, are ethnic because they come from a particular culture.

=== Demographic classification ===
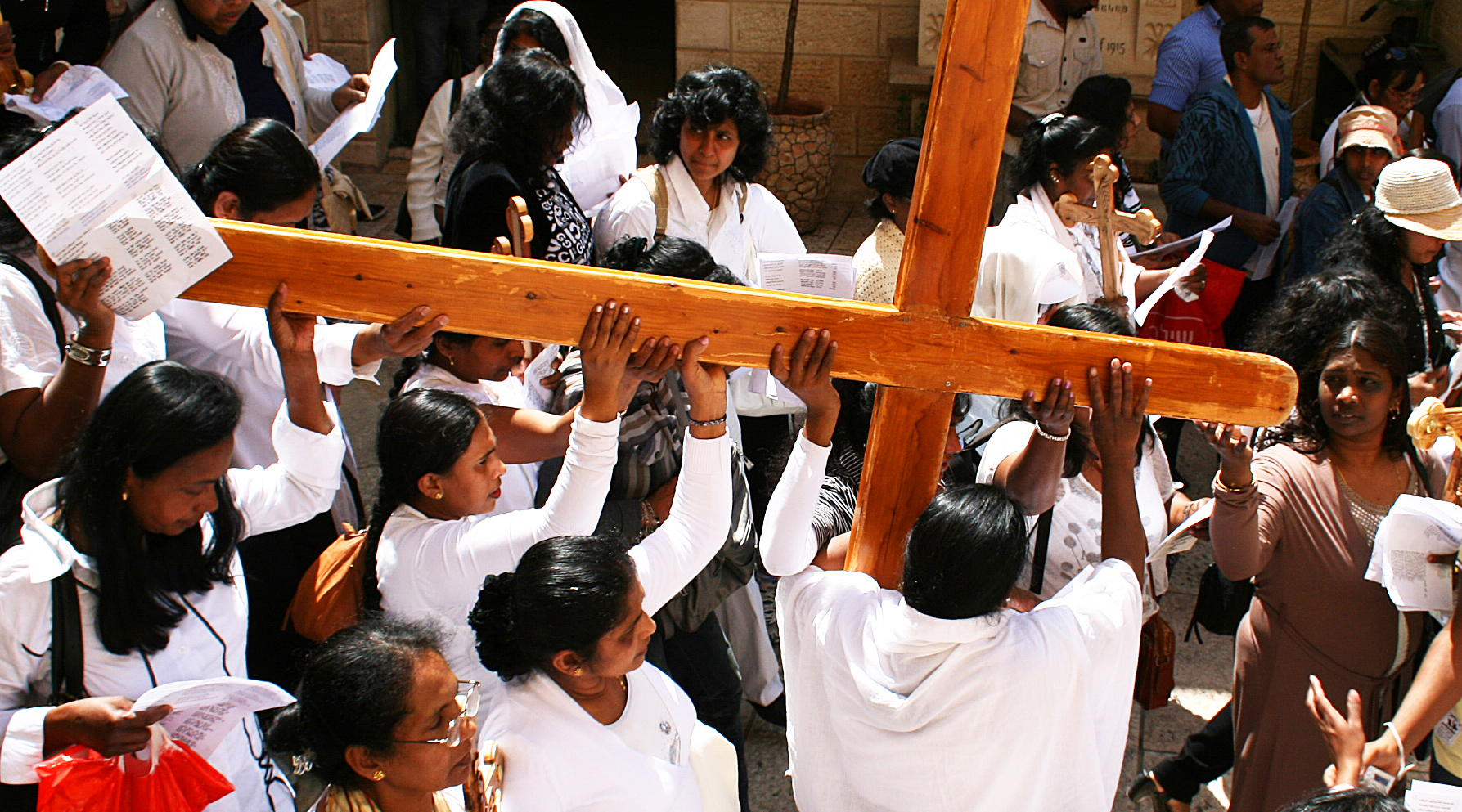
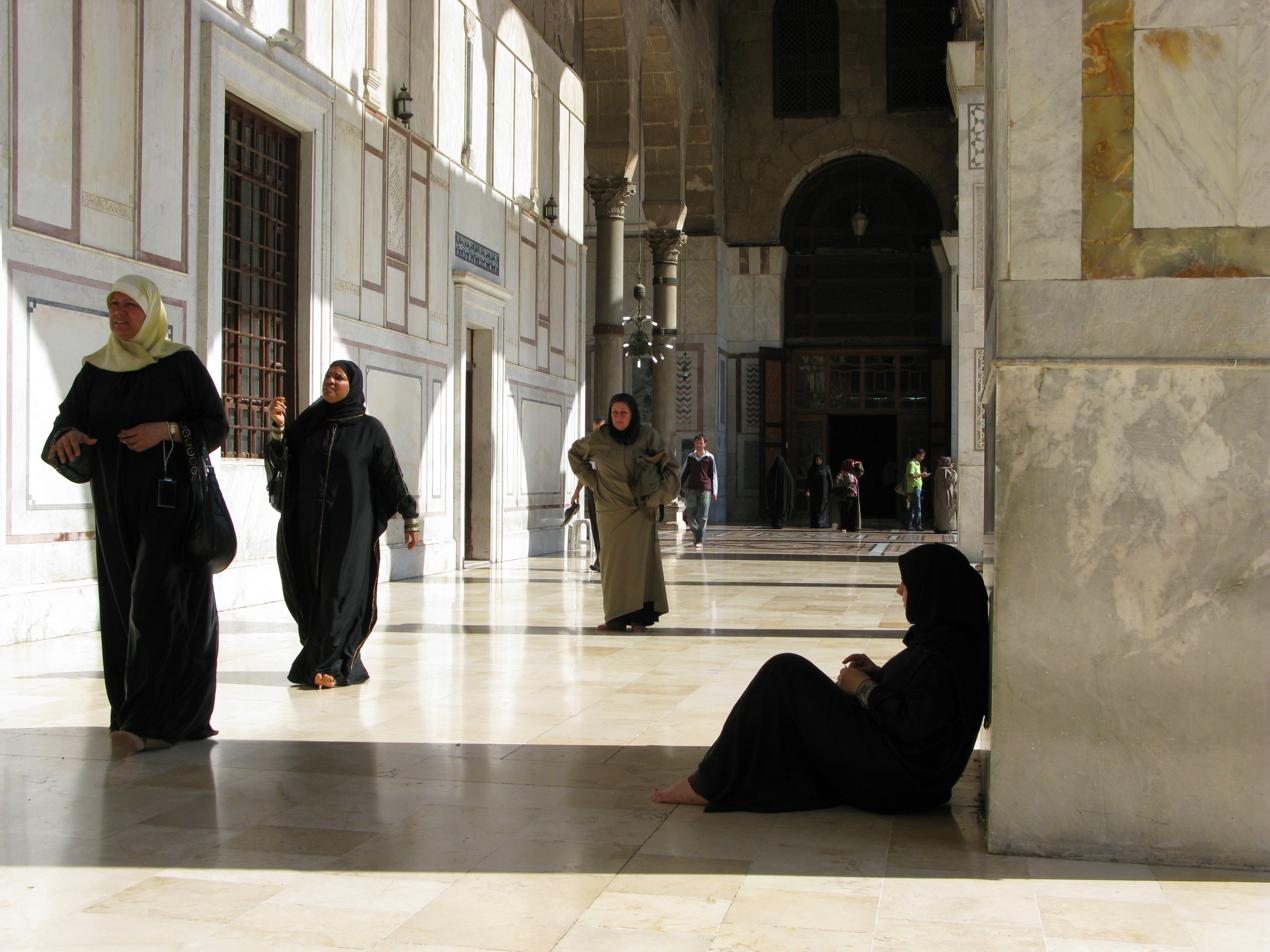
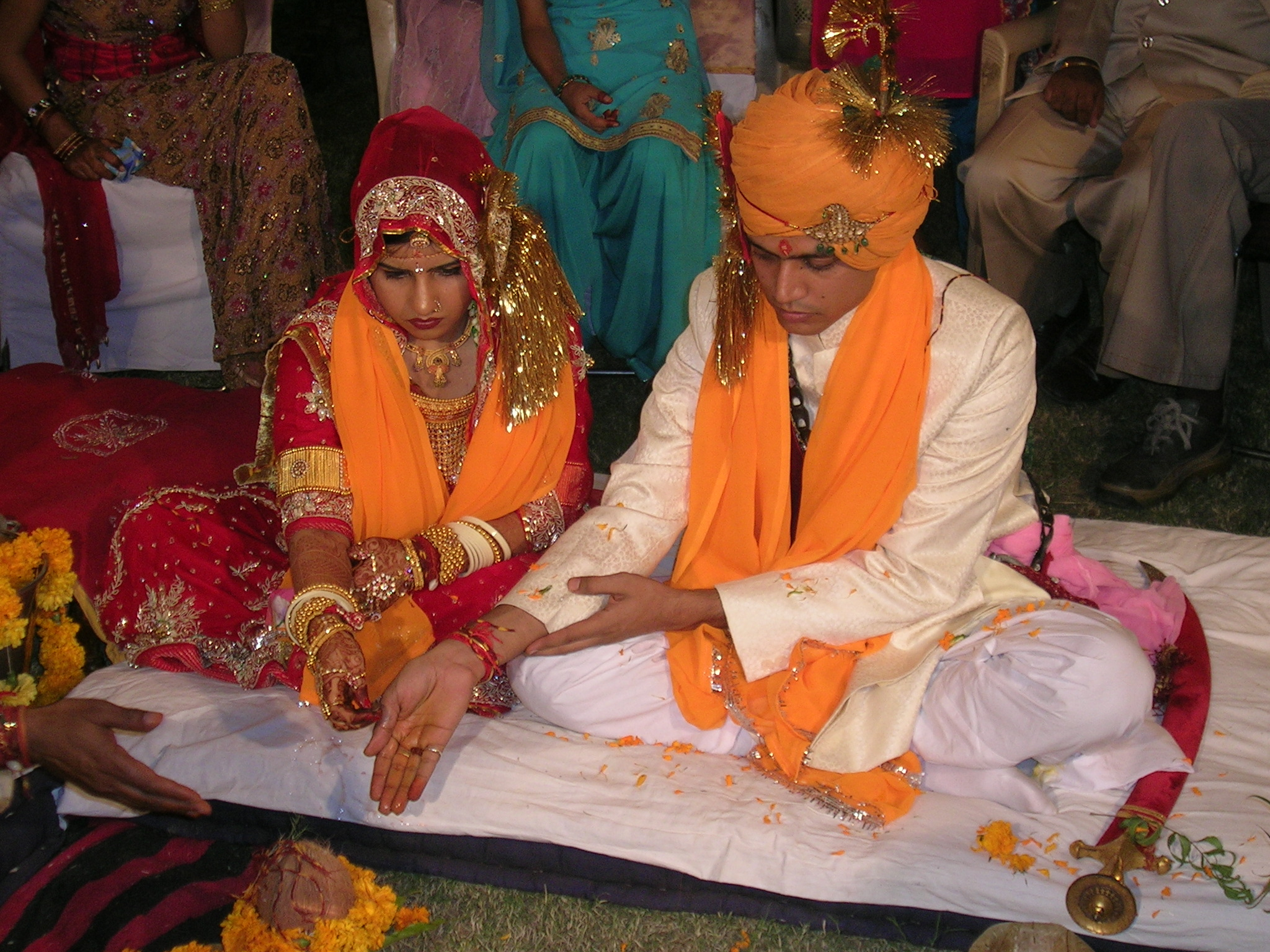
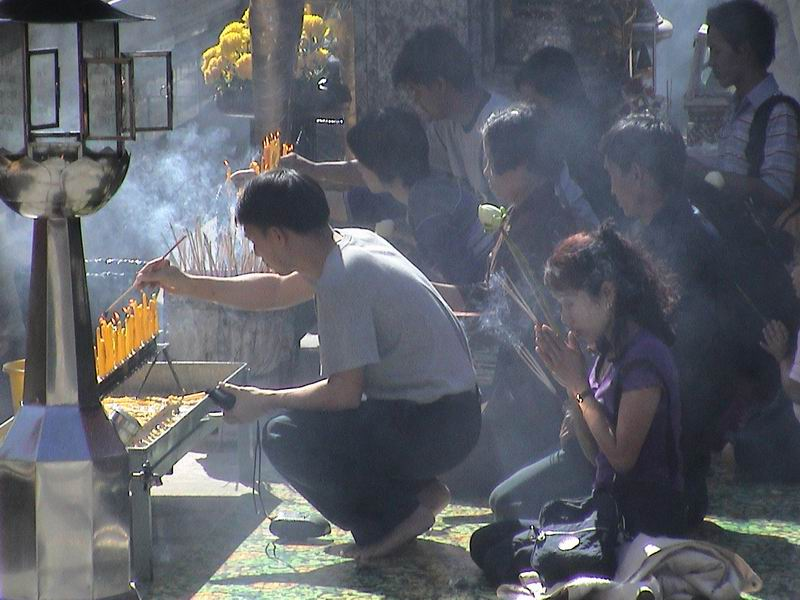
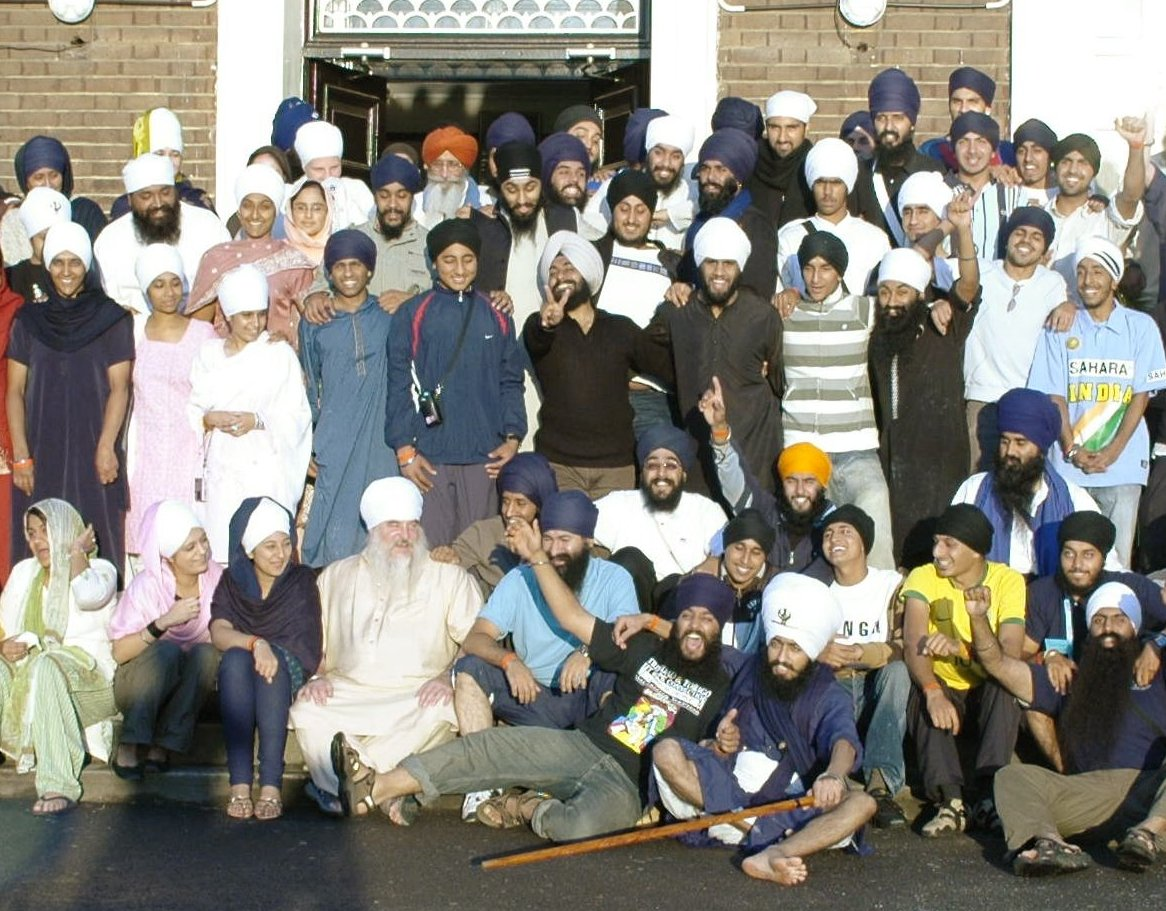
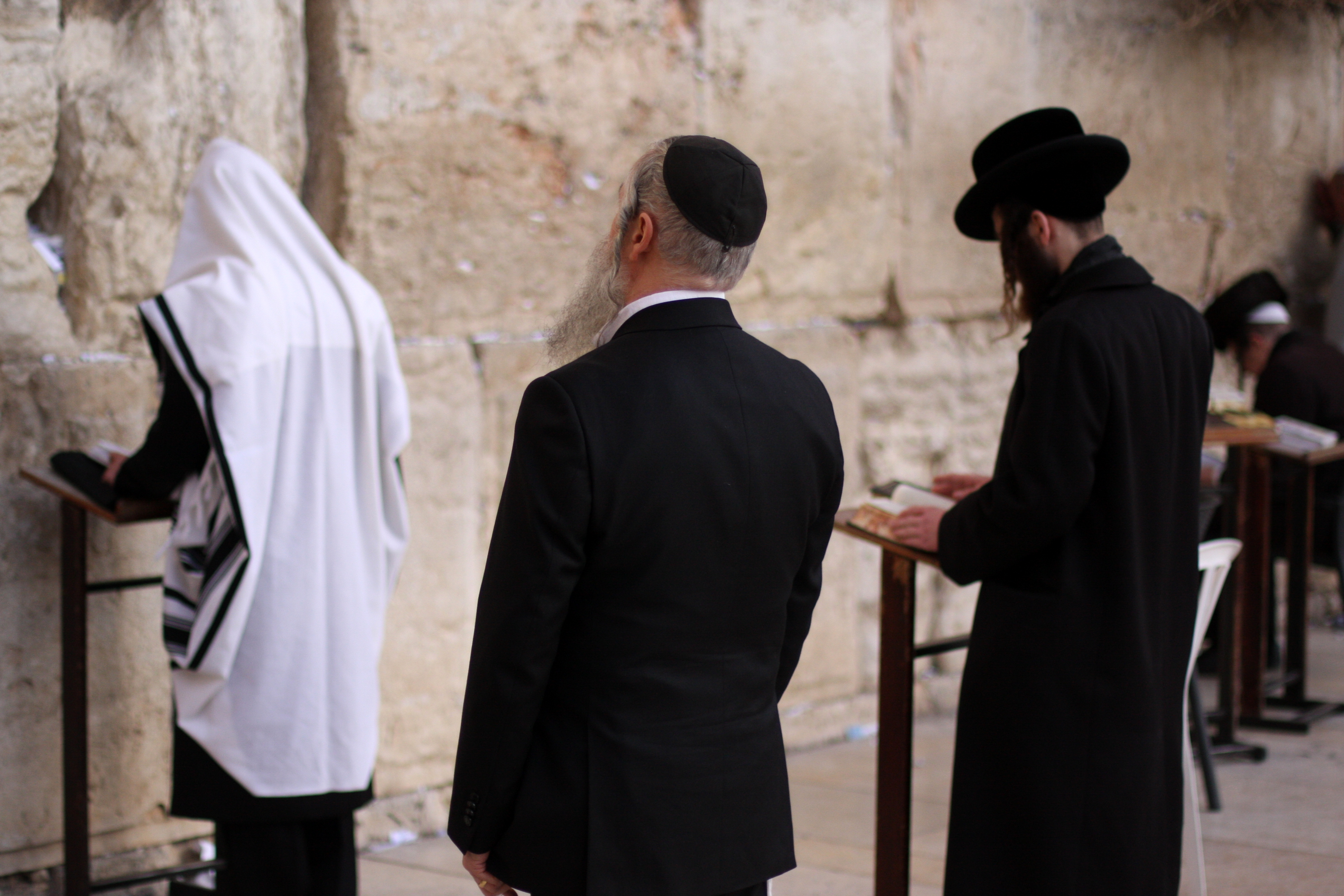
Example of followers of popular and world religions, from top-left: Christians, Muslims, Hindus, Buddhists, Sikhs, and Jews.

The four largest religious groups by world population, estimated to account for 5.8 billion people and 73% of the population, are Christianity, Islam, Buddhism and Hinduism (with the relative numbers for Buddhism and Hinduism dependent on the extent of syncretism).

Largest religions	2020 (billion)	2020 (%)	Demographics
Christianity	2.3	28.8%	Christianity by country
Islam	2.0	25.6%	Islam by country
Hinduism	1.2	14.9%	Hinduism by country
Buddhism	0.3	4.1%	Buddhism by country
Total	5.8	73.4%	Religions by country

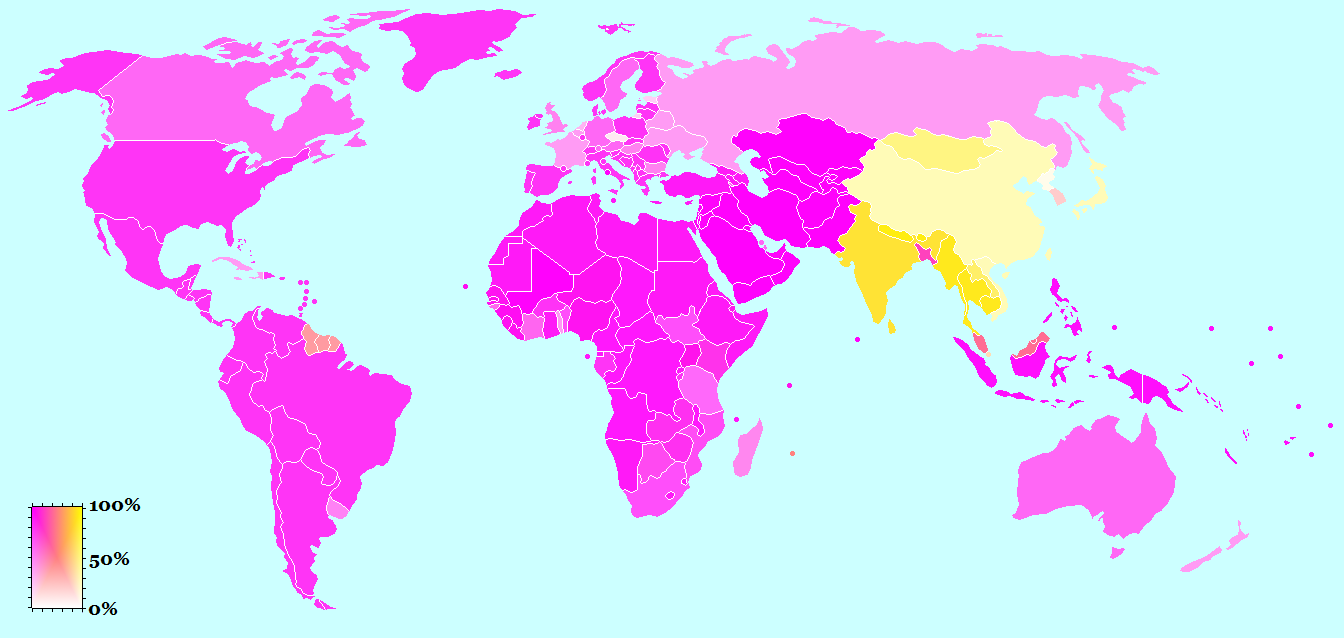
A rough split of the world among belief systems: Abrahamic in pink, Indian in yellow.

A global poll in 2012 surveyed 57 countries and reported that 59% of the world's population identified as religious, 23% as not religious, 13% as convinced atheists, and also a 9% decrease in identification as religious when compared to the 2005 average from 39 countries. A follow-up poll in 2015 found that 63% of the globe identified as religious, 22% as not religious, and 11% as convinced atheists. On average, women are more religious than men. Some people follow multiple religions or multiple religious principles at the same time, regardless of whether or not the religious principles they follow traditionally allow for syncretism. Unaffiliated populations are projected to drop, even when taking disaffiliation rates into account, due to differences in birth rates.

Scholars have indicated that global religiosity may be increasing due to religious countries having higher birth rates in general.

== Specific religions ==
Global percentage of adherents by religion

=== Abrahamic ===
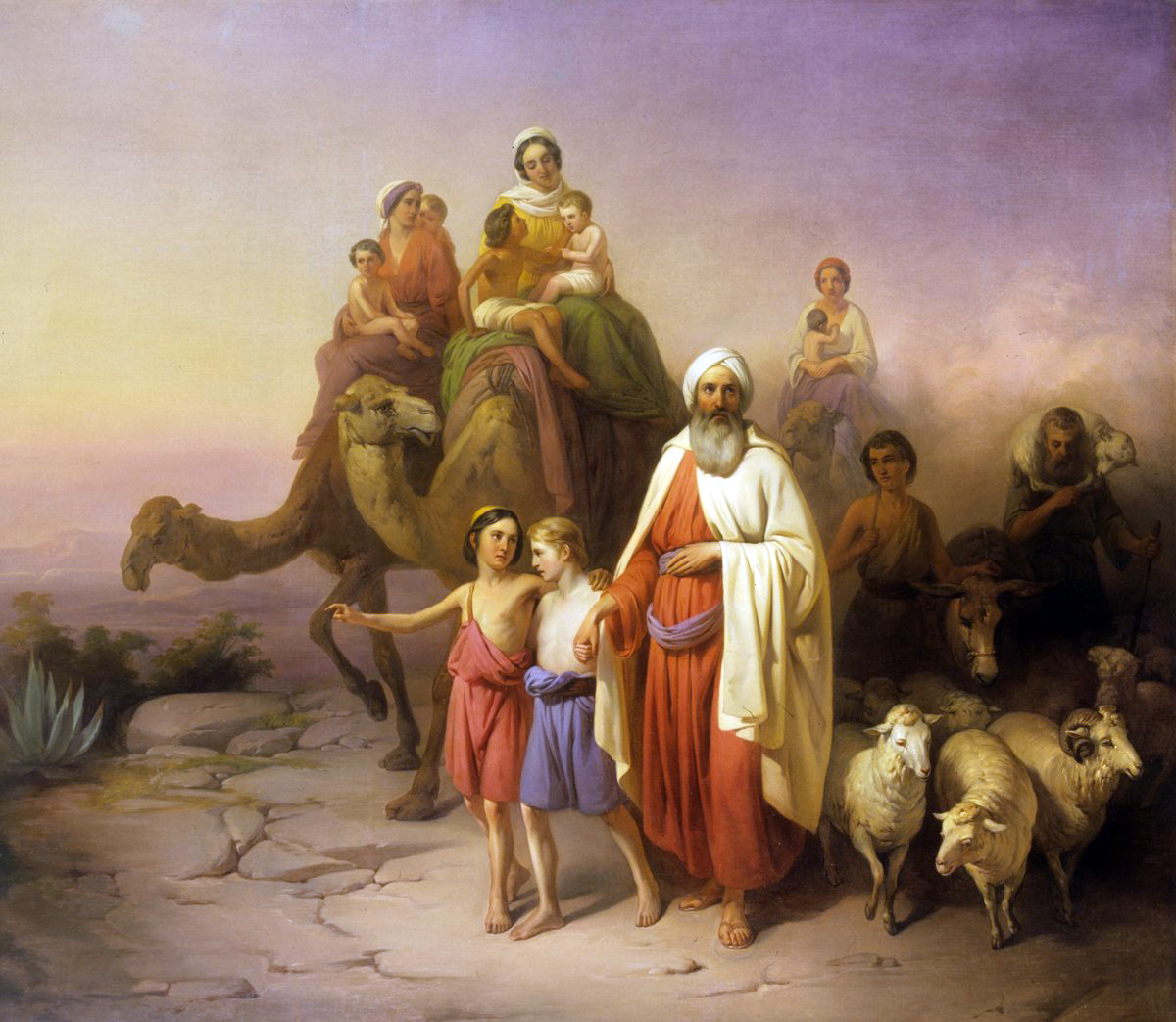
The patriarch Abraham (by József Molnár)

Abrahamic religions are monotheistic religions which believe they descend from Abraham.

==== Judaism ====
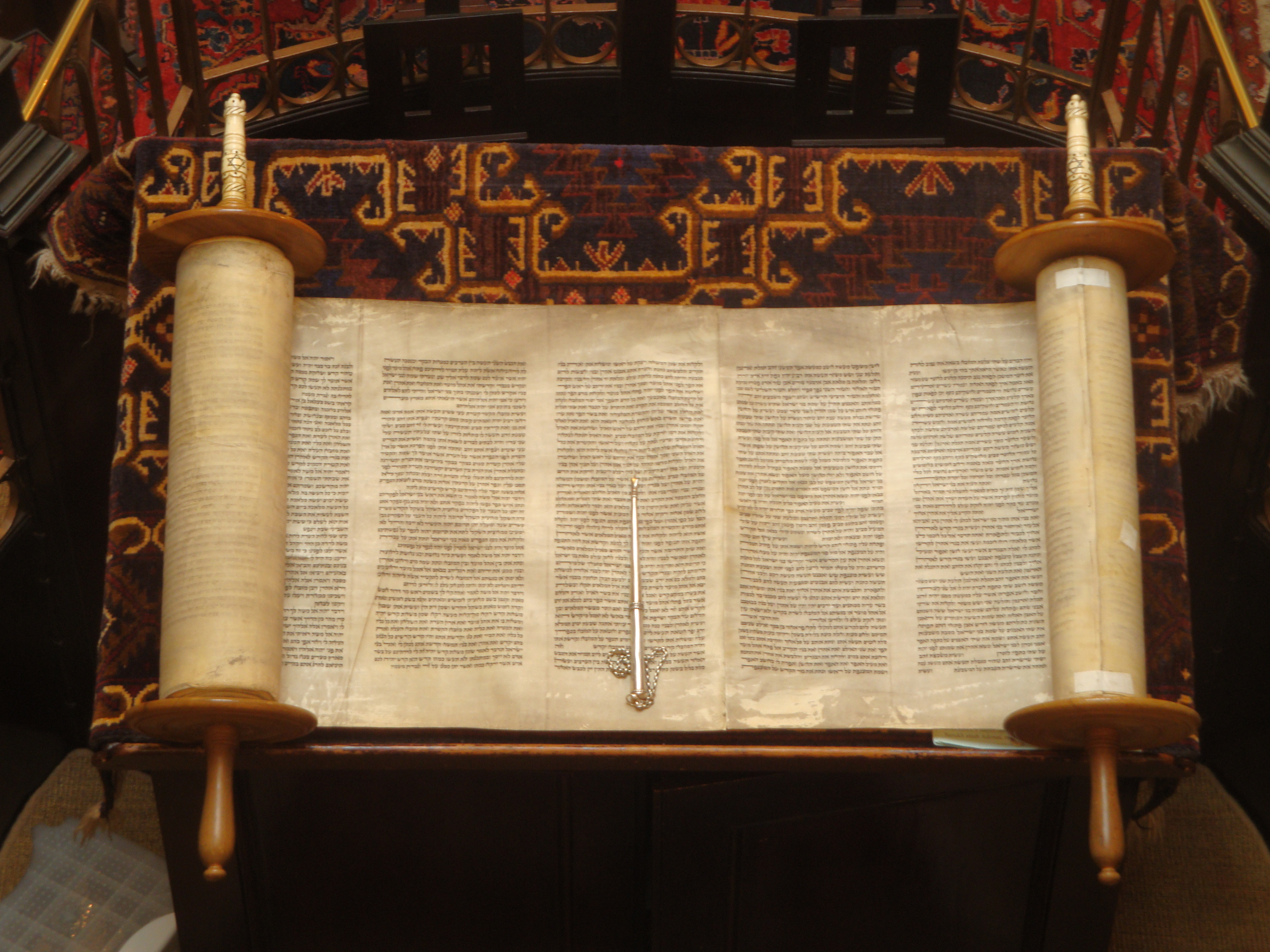
The Torah is the primary sacred text of Judaism.

Judaism is the oldest Abrahamic religion, originating in the people of ancient Israel and Judah. The Torah is its foundational text, and is part of the larger text known as the Tanakh or Hebrew Bible. It is supplemented by oral tradition, set down in written form in later texts such as the Midrash and the Talmud. Judaism includes a wide corpus of texts, practices, theological positions, and forms of organization. Within Judaism there are a variety of movements, most of which emerged from Rabbinic Judaism, which holds that God revealed his laws and commandments to Moses on Mount Sinai in the form of both the Written and Oral Torah; historically, this assertion was challenged by various groups. The Jewish people were scattered after the destruction of the Temple in Jerusalem in 70 CE. Today there are about 13 million Jews, about 40 per cent living in Israel and 40 per cent in the United States. The largest Jewish religious movements are Orthodox Judaism (Haredi Judaism and Modern Orthodox Judaism), Conservative Judaism and Reform Judaism.

==== Christianity ====
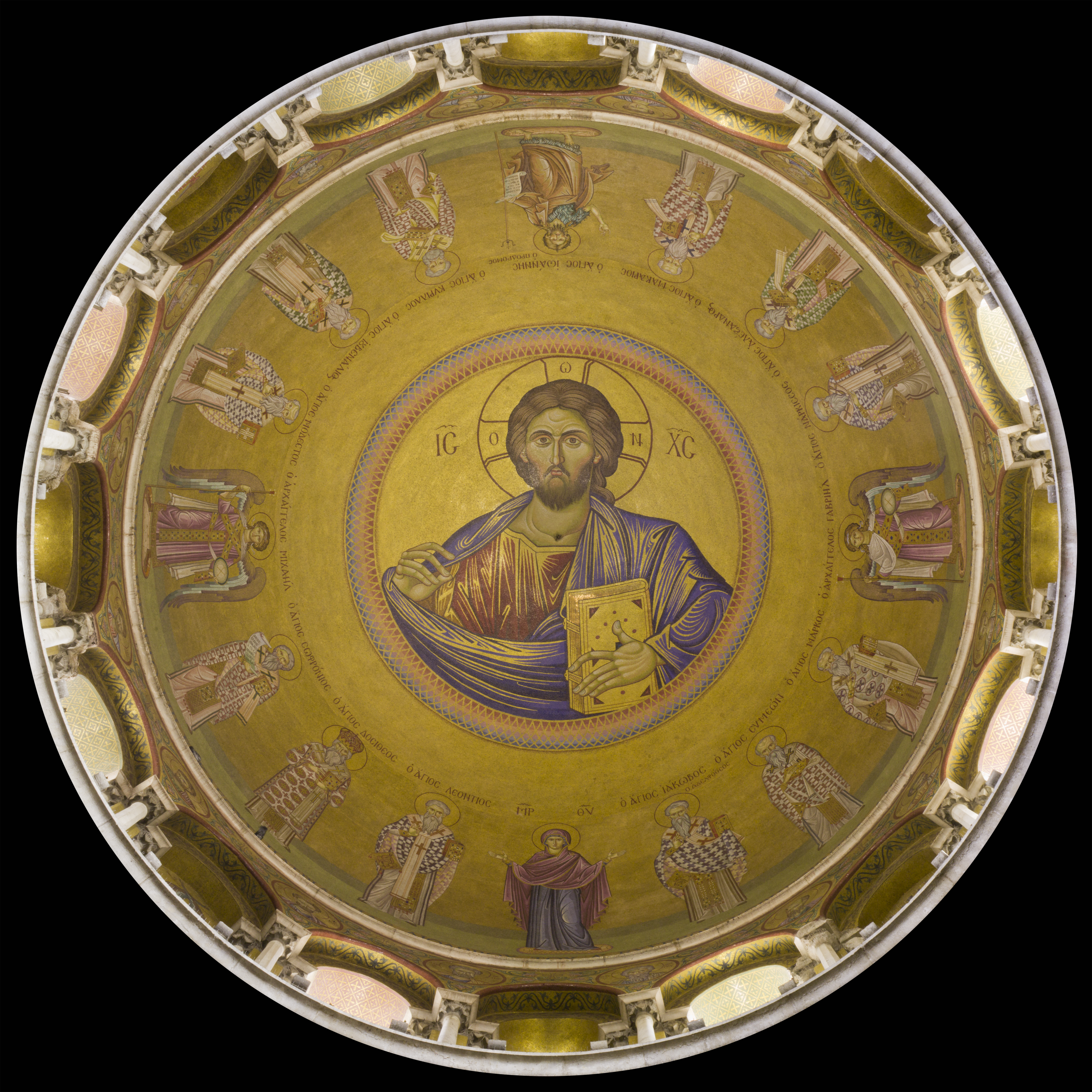
Jesus is the central figure of Christianity.

Christianity is based on the life and teachings of Jesus of Nazareth (1st century) as presented in the New Testament. The Christian faith is essentially faith in Jesus as the Christ, the Son of God, and as Savior and Lord. Almost all Christians believe in the Trinity, which teaches the unity of Father, Son (Jesus Christ), and Holy Spirit as three persons in one Godhead. Most Christians can describe their faith with the Nicene Creed. As the religion of Byzantine Empire in the first millennium and of Western Europe during the time of colonization, Christianity has been propagated throughout the world via missionary work. It is the world's largest religion, with about 2.3 billion followers as of 2015. The main divisions of Christianity are, according to the number of adherents:

- The Catholic Church, led by the Bishop of Rome and the bishops worldwide in communion with him, is a communion of 24 Churches sui iuris, including the Latin Church and 23 Eastern Catholic churches, such as the Maronite Catholic Church.
- Eastern Christianity, which include Eastern Orthodoxy, Oriental Orthodoxy, and the Church of the East.
- Protestantism, separated from the Catholic Church in the 16th-century Protestant Reformation and is split into thousands of denominations. Major branches of Protestantism include Anglicanism, Baptists, Calvinism, Lutheranism, and Methodism, though each of these contain many different denominations or groups.

There are also smaller groups, including:

- Restorationism, the belief that Christianity should be restored (as opposed to reformed) along the lines of what is known about the apostolic early church.
- Latter Day Saint movement, founded by Joseph Smith in the late 1820s. Most Latter Day Saints differ from mainstream Christianity in their nontrinitarian understanding of God and their inclusion of scriptures in addition to the Bible, such as the Doctrine and Covenants, Book of Mormon, and the Pearl of Great Price.
- Jehovah's Witnesses, founded in the late 1870s by Charles Taze Russell. Jehovah's Witnesses are a non-Trinitarian group, believing that Jesus is subordinate to God. Jehovah's Witnesses believe that their members should be politically neutral, and members generally will not vote in elections or serve in a country's military.

==== Islam ====
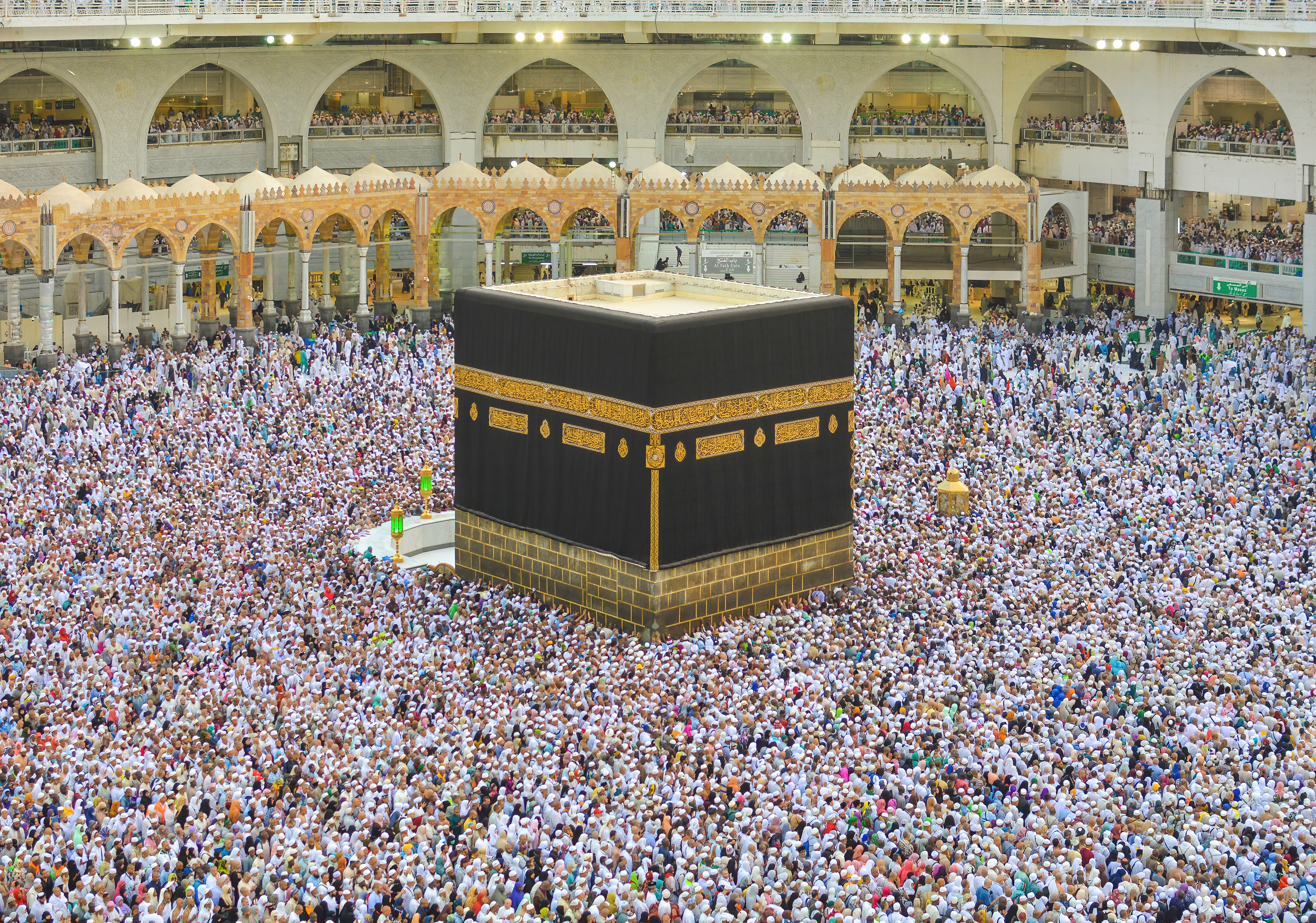
Muslims circumambulating the Kaaba in Mecca, Saudi Arabia, the most sacred site in Islam

Islam is a monotheistic religion based on the Quran, one of the holy books considered by Muslims to be revealed by God, and on the teachings (hadith) of the Islamic prophet Muhammad, a major political and religious figure of the 7th century CE. Islam is based on the unity of all religious philosophies and accepts all of the Abrahamic prophets of Judaism, Christianity and other Abrahamic religions before Muhammad. It is the most widely practiced religion of Southeast Asia, North Africa, Western Asia, and Central Asia, while Muslim-majority countries also exist in parts of South Asia, Sub-Saharan Africa, and Southeast Europe. There are also several Islamic republics, including Iran, Pakistan, Mauritania, and Afghanistan. With about 2 billion followers (2020), a quarter of earth's population are Muslims.

- Sunni Islam is the largest denomination within Islam and follows the Qur'an, the ahadith (plural of Hadith) which record the sunnah, whilst placing emphasis on the sahabah.
- Shia Islam is the second largest denomination of Islam and its adherents believe that Ali succeeded Muhammad and further places emphasis on Muhammad's family.
- There are also Muslim revivalist movements such as Muwahhidism and Salafism.

Other denominations of Islam include Nation of Islam, Ibadi, Sufism, Quranism, Mahdavia, Ahmadiyya and non-denominational Muslims. Wahhabism is the dominant Muslim schools of thought in the Kingdom of Saudi Arabia.

==== Other ====
Judaism, Christianity, and Islam are the three most popular Abrahamic faiths, however there are smaller and newer traditions that are also considered Abrahamic.

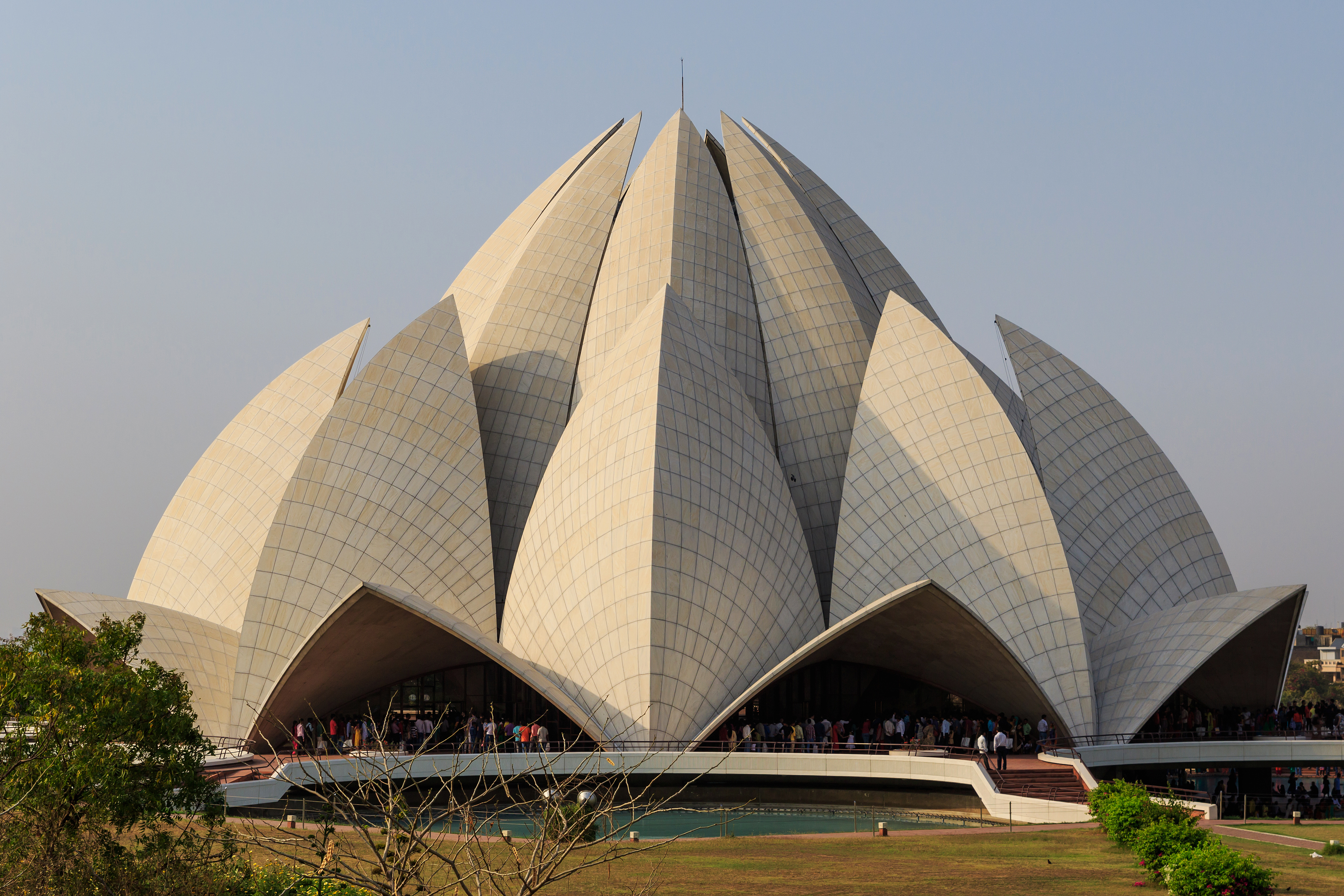
The Baháʼí Lotus Temple in Delhi

For example, the Baháʼí Faith, though often called a new religious movement, claims to be a world religion from the line of major Abrahamic religions, while recognizing the Indo-Iranian traditions (Hinduism, Buddhism, Zoroastrianism). Founded in 19th-century Iran, it teaches the unity of all great religious traditions as the progressive unfolding of one religion and accepts all of the prophets of Judaism, Christianity, and Islam as well as additional prophets (Krishna, Buddha, Zoroaster), including its founder Bahá'u'lláh. Its initial phase as Bábism forms an integral part of its history.

Samaritanism is primarily practiced in Israel and the State of Palestine. While there were over a million Samaritans during the writing of the Bible, as of 2021, only around 800 remain.

Rastafari developed in colonial Jamaica during the 1930s, following the coronation of Haile Selassie I as emperor of Ethiopia, who was believed to be a descendant of King Solomon and the Queen of Sheba. Early Rastafaris preached the authority of Selassie over the English ruler, King George V and Selassie is seen by some Rastafaris as an incarnation of God. Rastafari beliefs combines teachings from the Old Testament with Pan-Africanism, and also includes ritual marijuana use, as well as a rejection of materialism, with many Rastafaris only eating unprocessed foods and growing their hair into dreadlocks.

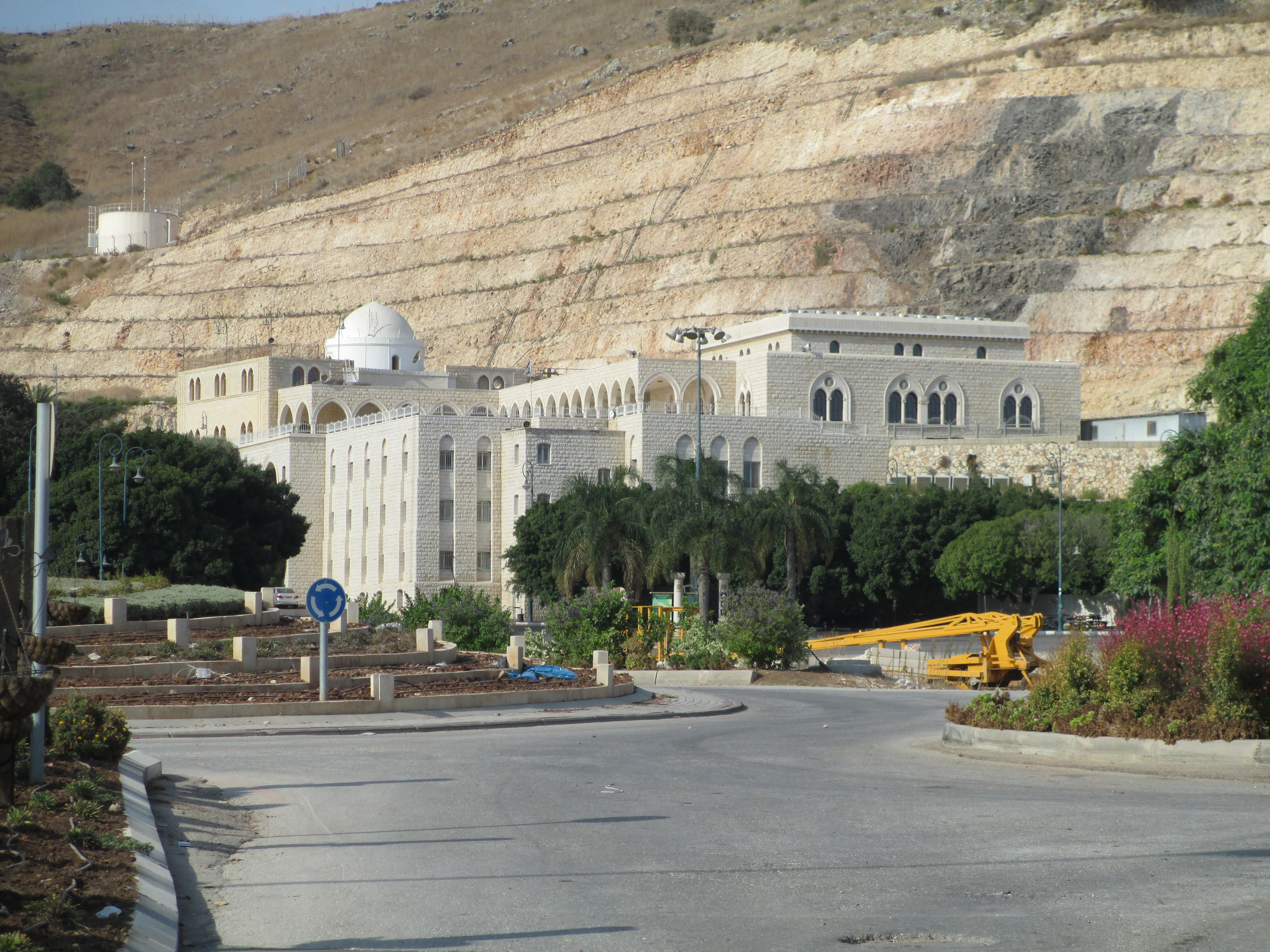
The shrine of Nabi Shu'ayb complex is revered as the foremost religious site in the Druze religion

The Druze faith is an ethnic and esoteric religion, that restricts certain religious knowledge to a minority religious elite group called uqqāl, or "the wise". Druze originally developed out of Isma'ilism, and it has sometimes been considered an Islamic school by some Islamic authorities, but Druze themselves do not identify as Muslims. Scholars classify the Druze faith as an independent Abrahamic religion because it developed its own unique doctrines and eventually separated from both Isma'ilism and Islam altogether. One of these doctrines includes the belief that Al-Ḥākim bi-Amr Allāh was an incarnation of God. Druze is primarily practiced in Syria, Lebanon, and Israel, with a smaller community in Jordan.

Mandaeism, sometimes also known as Sabianism (after the mysterious Sabians mentioned in the Quran, a name historically claimed by several religious groups), is a Gnostic, monotheistic and ethnic religion. Its adherents, the Mandaeans, consider John the Baptist to be their chief prophet. Mandaeans are the last surviving Gnostics from antiquity.

=== East Asian ===
East Asian religions (also known as Far Eastern religions or Taoic religions) consist of several religions of East Asia which make use of the concept of Tao (in Chinese), Dō (in Japanese or Korean) or Đạo (in Vietnamese). They include:

==== Taoism and Confucianism ====
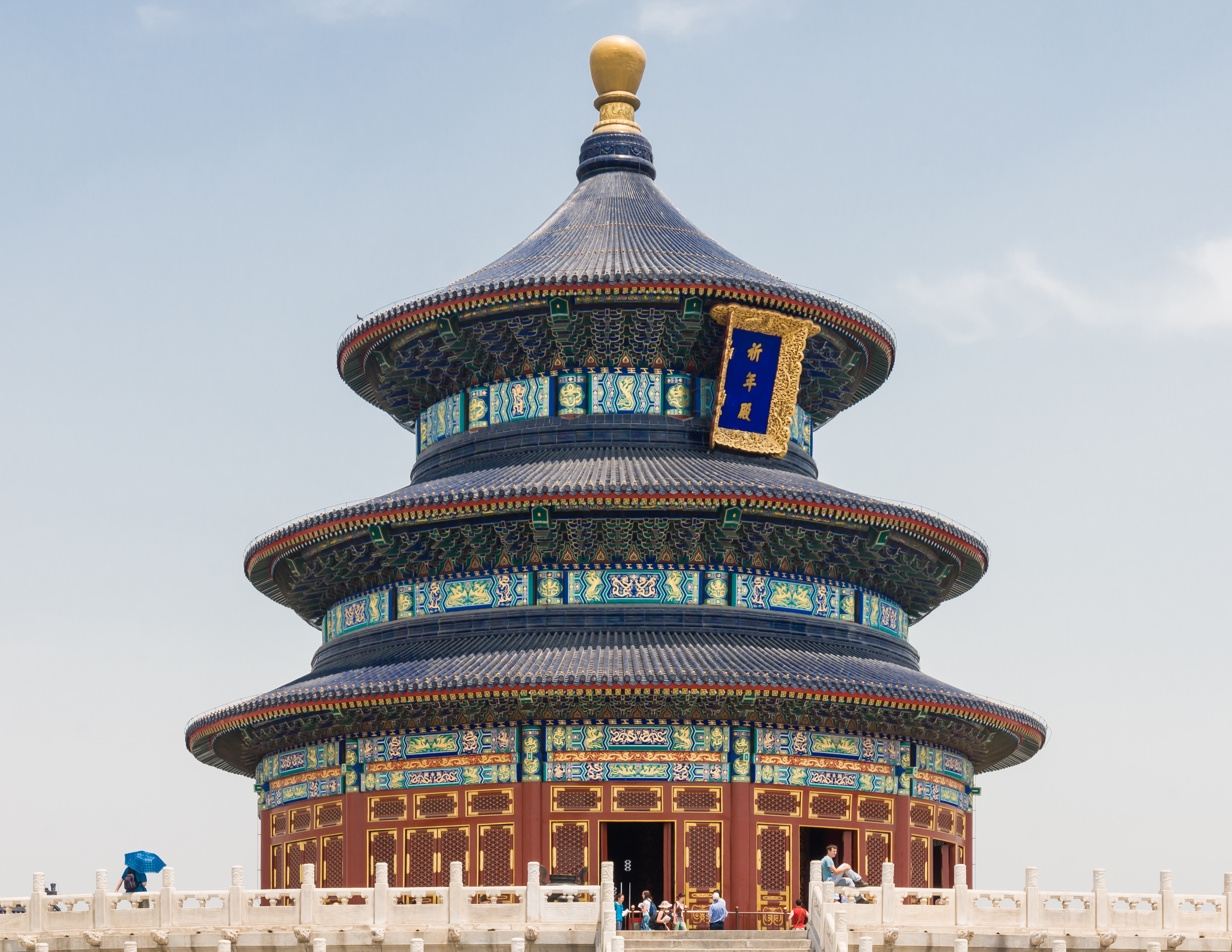
The Temple of Heaven, a Taoist temple complex in Beijing

- Taoism and Confucianism, as well as Korean, Vietnamese, and Japanese religion influenced by Chinese thought.

==== Folk religions ====
Chinese folk religion: the indigenous religions of the Han Chinese, or, by metonymy, of all the populations of the Chinese cultural sphere. It includes the syncretism of Confucianism, Taoism and Buddhism, Wuism, as well as many new religious movements such as Chen Tao, Falun Gong and Yiguandao.

Other folk and new religions of East Asia and Southeast Asia such as Korean shamanism, Chondogyo, and Jeung San Do in Korea; indigenous Philippine folk religions in the Philippines; Shinto, Shugendo, Ryukyuan religion, and Japanese new religions in Japan; Satsana Phi in Laos; Vietnamese folk religion, and Cao Đài, Hòa Hảo in Vietnam.

=== Indian religions ===
Indian religions are practiced or were founded in the Indian subcontinent. They are sometimes classified as the dharmic religions, as they all feature dharma, the specific law of reality and duties expected according to the religion.

==== Hinduism ====
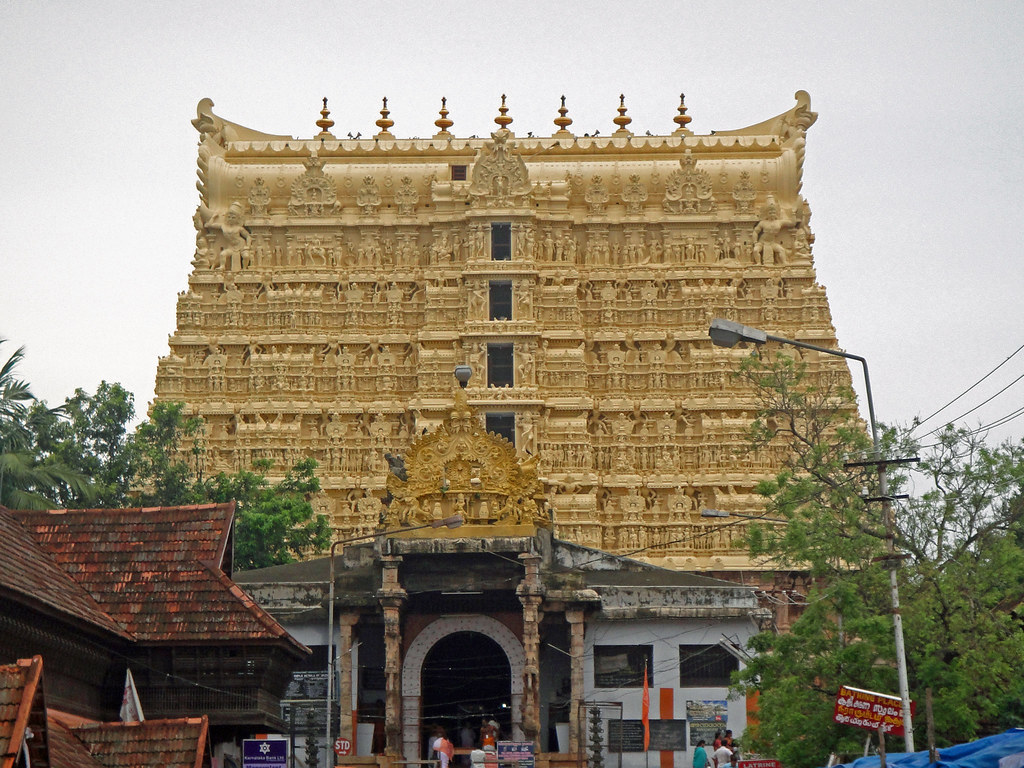
The Padmanabhaswamy Temple is a significant temple of the Hindu god Vishnu in Thiruvananthapuram, India.

Hinduism is also called Vaidika Dharma, the dharma of the Vedas, although many practitioners refer to their religion as Sanātana Dharma ("the Eternal Dharma") which refers to the idea that its origins lie beyond human history. Vaidika Dharma is a synecdoche describing the similar philosophies of Vaishnavism, Shaivism, and related groups practiced or founded in the Indian subcontinent. Concepts most of them share in common include karma, caste, reincarnation, mantras, yantras, and darśana. (Note: Hinduism is variously defined as a religion, set of religious beliefs and practices, religious tradition etc. For a discussion on the topic, see: "Establishing the boundaries" in Gavin Flood (2003), pp. 1–17. René Guénon in his Introduction to the Study of the Hindu doctrines (1921 ed.), Sophia Perennis, ISBN 0-900588-74-8, proposes a definition of the term religion and a discussion of its relevance (or lack of) to Hindu doctrines (part II, chapter 4, p. 58).) Deities in Hinduism are referred to as Deva (masculine) and Devi (feminine). Major deities include Vishnu, Lakshmi, Shiva, Parvati, Brahma and Saraswati. These deities have distinct and complex personalities yet are often viewed as aspects of the same Ultimate Reality called Brahman. (Note: [a] Hark, Lisa; DeLisser, Horace (2011). Achieving Cultural Competency. John Wiley & Sons. "Three gods, Brahma, Vishnu, and Shiva, and other deities are considered manifestations of and are worshipped as incarnations of Brahman." [b] Toropov & Buckles 2011: The members of various Hindu sects worship a dizzying number of specific deities and follow innumerable rites in honor of specific gods. Because this is Hinduism, however, its practitioners see the profusion of forms and practices as expressions of the same unchanging reality. The panoply of deities are understood by believers as symbols for a single transcendent reality. [d] Orlando O. Espín, James B. Nickoloff (2007). An Introductory Dictionary of Theology and Religious Studies. Liturgical Press. "While Hindus believe in many devas, many are monotheistic to the extent that they will recognise only one Supreme Being, a God or Goddess who is the source and ruler of the devas.")

==== Jainism ====
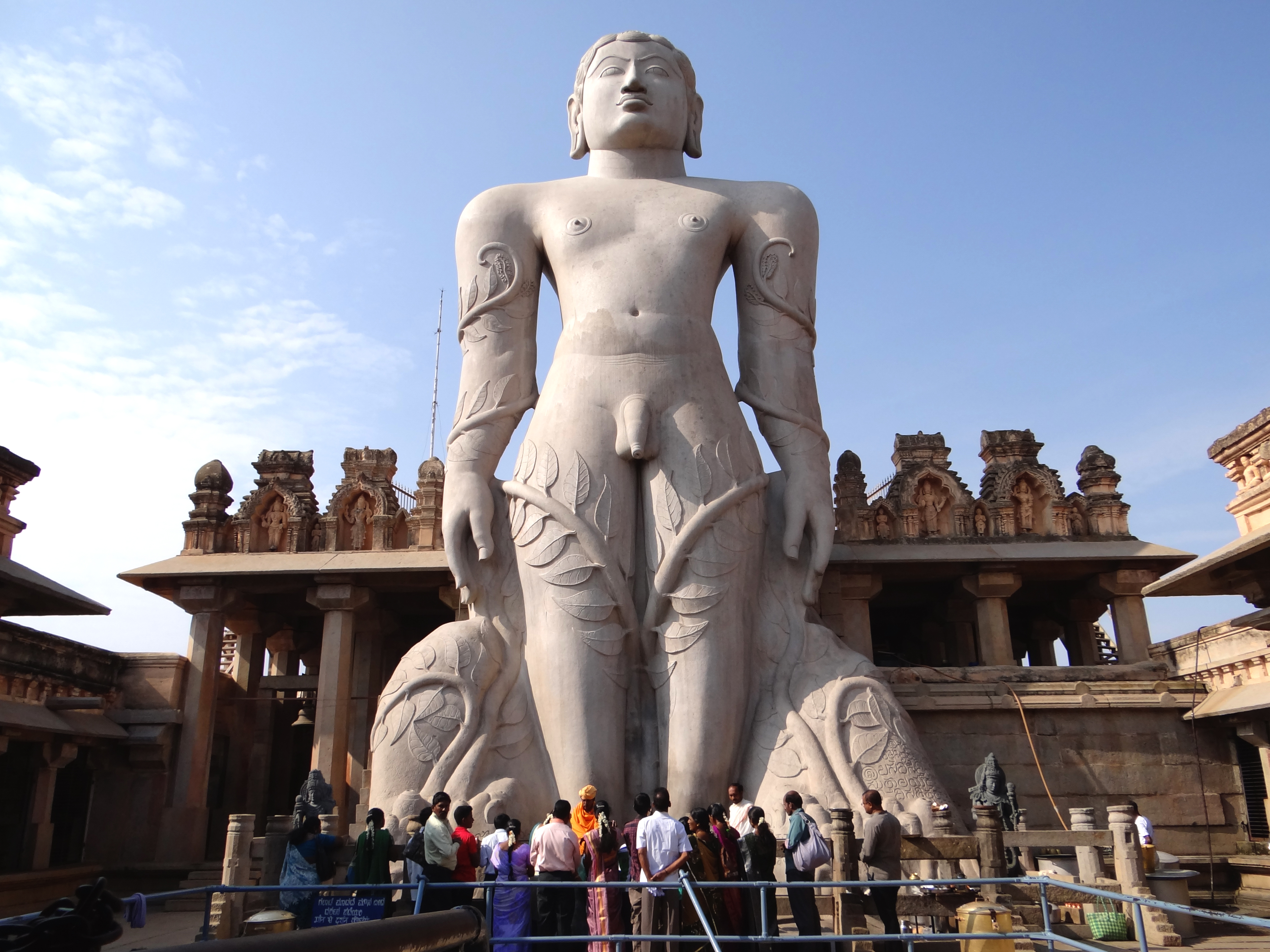
The 10th century Gommateshwara statue in Karnataka

Jainism, taught primarily by Rishabhanatha (the founder of ahimsa) is an ancient Indian religion that prescribes a path of non-violence, truth and anekantavada for all forms of living beings in this universe; which helps them to eliminate all the Karmas, and hence to attain freedom from the cycle of birth and death (saṃsāra), that is, achieving nirvana. Jains are found mostly in India. According to Dundas, outside of the Jain tradition, historians date the Mahavira as about contemporaneous with the Buddha in the 5th-century BCE, and accordingly the historical Parshvanatha, based on the c. 250-year gap, is placed in 8th or 7th century BCE.

- Digambara Jainism (or sky-clad) is mainly practiced in South India. Their holy books are Pravachanasara and Samayasara written by their Prophets Kundakunda and Amritchandra as their original canon is lost.
- Shwetambara Jainism (or white-clad) is mainly practiced in Western India. Their holy books are Jain Agamas, written by their Prophet Sthulibhadra.

==== Buddhism ====
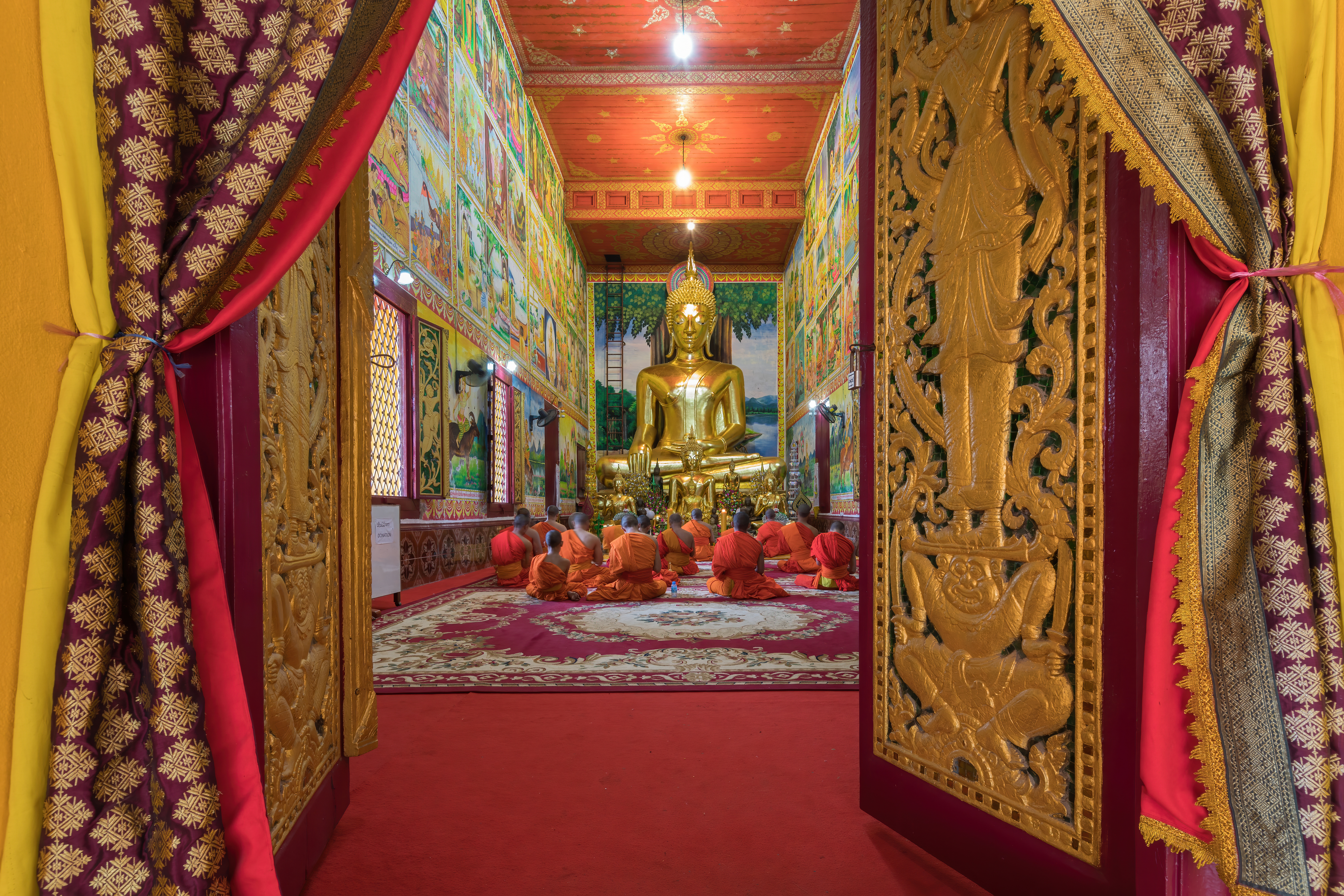
Wat Mixay Buddhist shrine in Vientiane, Laos

Buddhism was founded by Siddhartha Gautama in the 5th century BCE. Buddhists generally agree that Gotama aimed to help sentient beings end their suffering (dukkha) by understanding the true nature of phenomena, thereby escaping the cycle of suffering and rebirth (saṃsāra), that is, achieving nirvana.

- Theravada Buddhism, which is practiced mainly in Sri Lanka and Southeast Asia alongside folk religion, shares some characteristics of Indian religions. It is based in a large collection of texts called the Pali Canon.
- Mahayana Buddhism (or the Great Vehicle) under which are a multitude of doctrines that became prominent in China and are still relevant in Vietnam, Korea, Japan and to a lesser extent in Europe and the United States. Mahayana Buddhism includes such disparate teachings as Zen or Pure Land.
- Vajrayana Buddhism first appeared in India in the 3rd century CE. It is currently most prominent in the Himalaya regions and extends across all of Asia (cf. Mikkyō).
- Two notable new Buddhist sects are Hòa Hảo and the Navayana (Dalit Buddhist movement), which were developed separately in the 20th century.

==== Sikhism ====
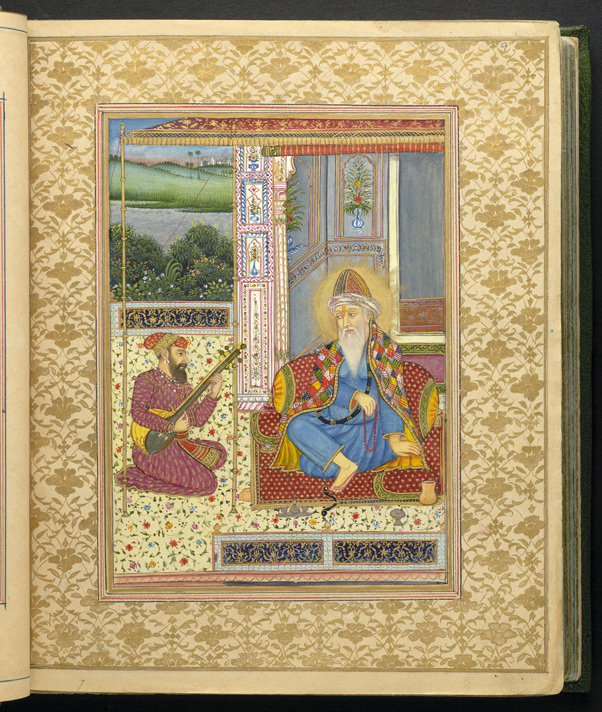
An 1840 miniature of Guru Nanak

Sikhism is a panentheistic religion founded on the teachings of Guru Nanak and ten successive Sikh gurus in 15th-century Punjab. It is the fifth-largest organized religion in the world, with approximately 30 million Sikhs.

The principal beliefs of Sikhi are faith in Waheguru—represented by the phrase Ik ōaṅkār, one cosmic divine actioner (God), who prevails in everything, along with a praxis in which the Sikh is enjoined to engage in social reform through the pursuit of justice for all human beings. Important concepts within Sikhism include: the Sant Sipāhī, transl. saint-soldier, who will use weapons when necessary to defend themselves and others from persecution, as well as sevā, selfless service to others.

=== Indigenous and folk ===
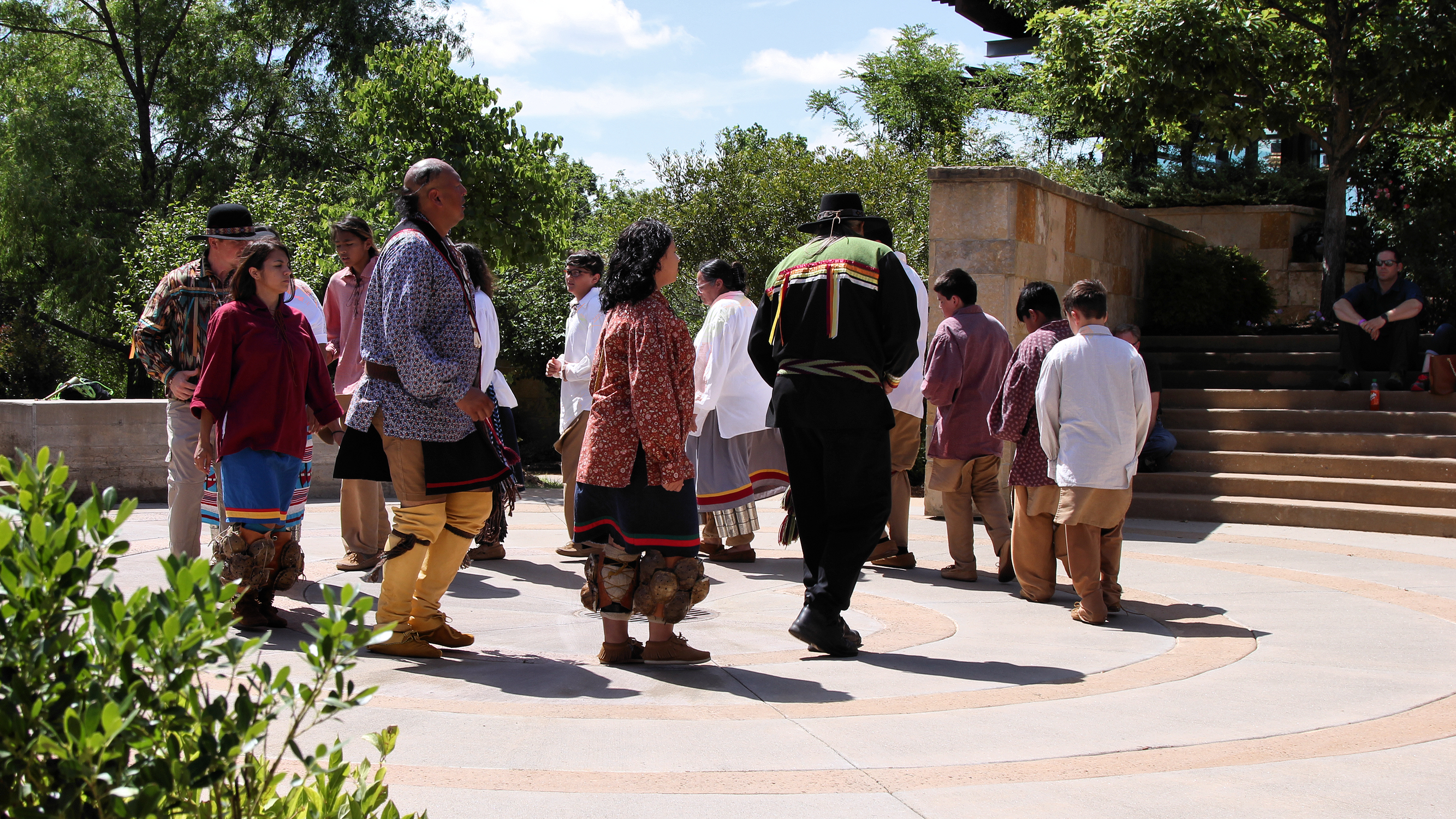
Chickasaw Native cultural/religious dancing

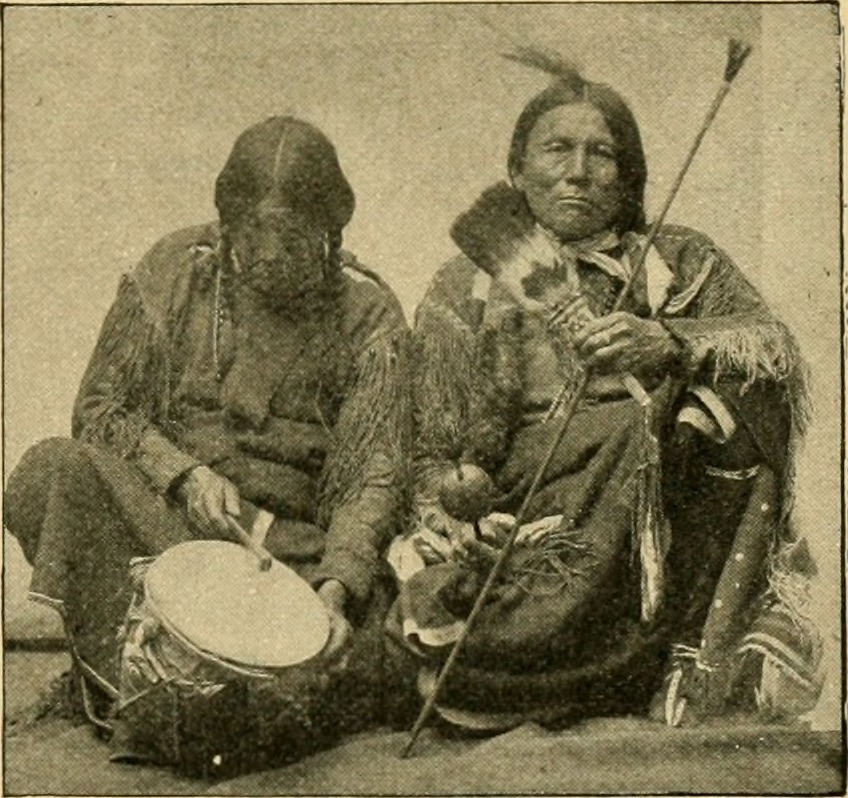
Peyotists with their ceremonial tools

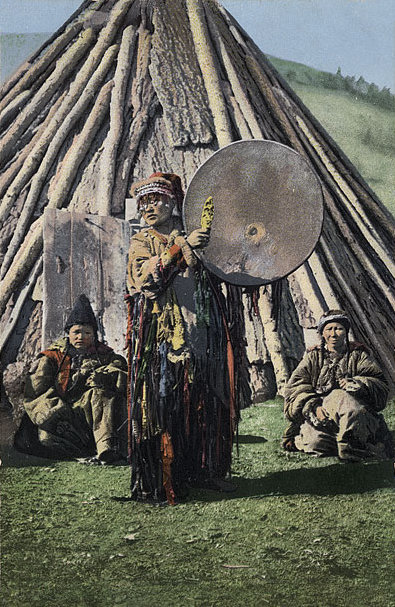
Altay shaman in Siberia

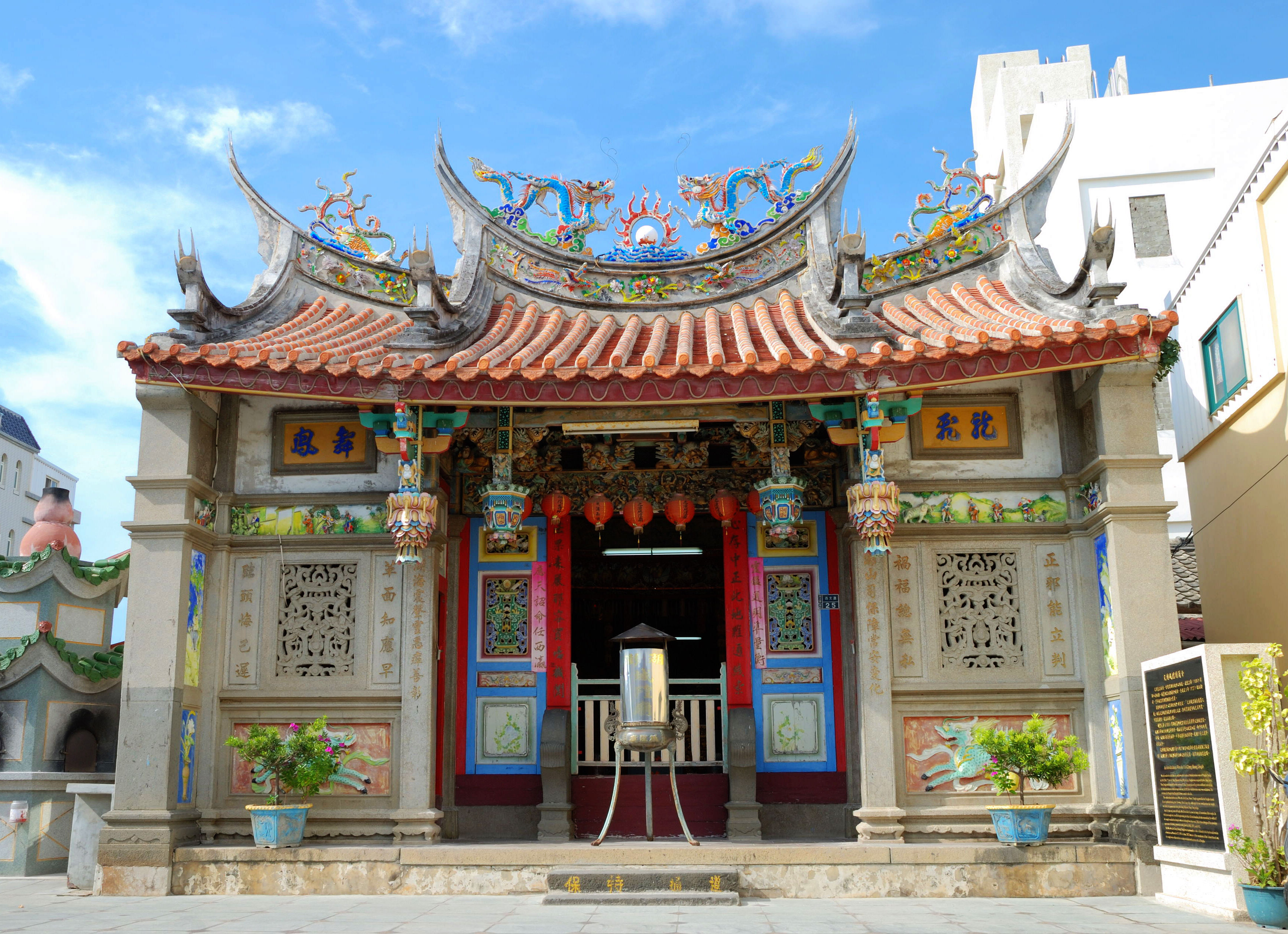
Temple to the city god of Wenao in Magong, Taiwan

Indigenous religions or folk religions refers to a broad category of traditional religions that can be characterised by shamanism, animism and ancestor worship, where traditional means "indigenous, that which is aboriginal or foundational, handed down from generation to generation...". These are religions that are closely associated with a particular group of people, ethnicity or tribe; they often have no formal creeds or sacred texts. Some religions are syncretic, fusing diverse religious beliefs and practices.

- Australian Aboriginal religions.
- Folk religions of the Americas: Native American religions

Folk religions are often omitted as a category in surveys even in countries where they are widely practiced, e.g., in China.

=== Traditional African ===
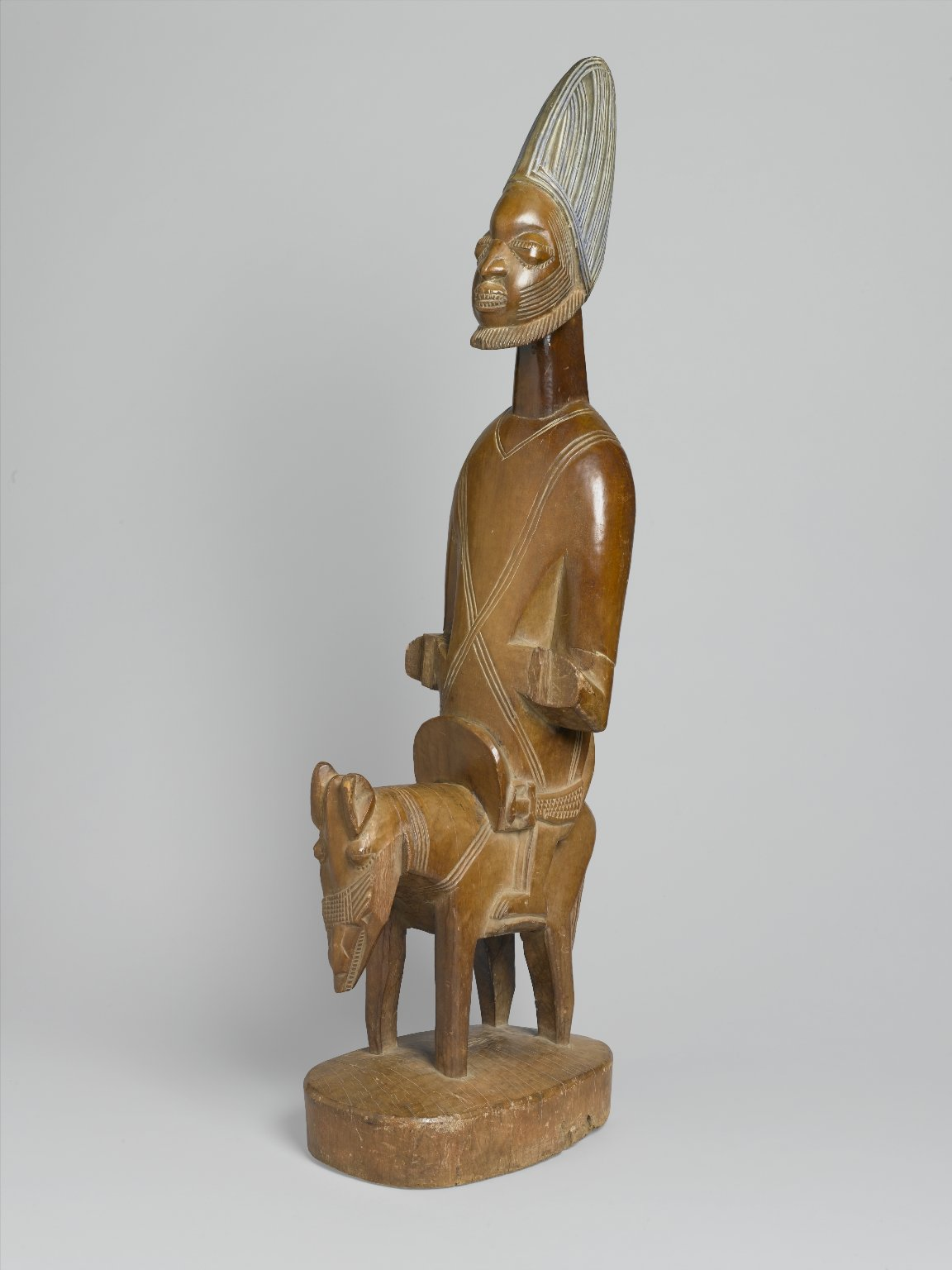
Shango, the Orisha of fire, lightning, and thunder, in the Yoruba religion, depicted on horseback

African traditional religion encompasses the traditional religious beliefs of people in Africa.

In West Africa, these religions include the Akan religion, Dahomey (Fon) mythology, Efik mythology, Odinani, Serer religion (A ƭat Roog), and Yoruba religion,

Central African traditions include Bushongo mythology, Mbuti (Pygmy) mythology, Lugbara mythology, Dinka religion, and Lotuko mythology come from central Africa.

Southern African traditions include Akamba mythology, Masai mythology, Malagasy mythology, San religion, Lozi mythology, Tumbuka mythology, and Zulu mythology.

Northern African traditions include Berber and ancient Egyptian.

Bantu mythology is found throughout central, southeast, and southern Africa.

There are also notable African diasporic religions practiced in the Americas, such as Santeria, Candomble, Vodun, Lucumi, Umbanda, and Macumba.

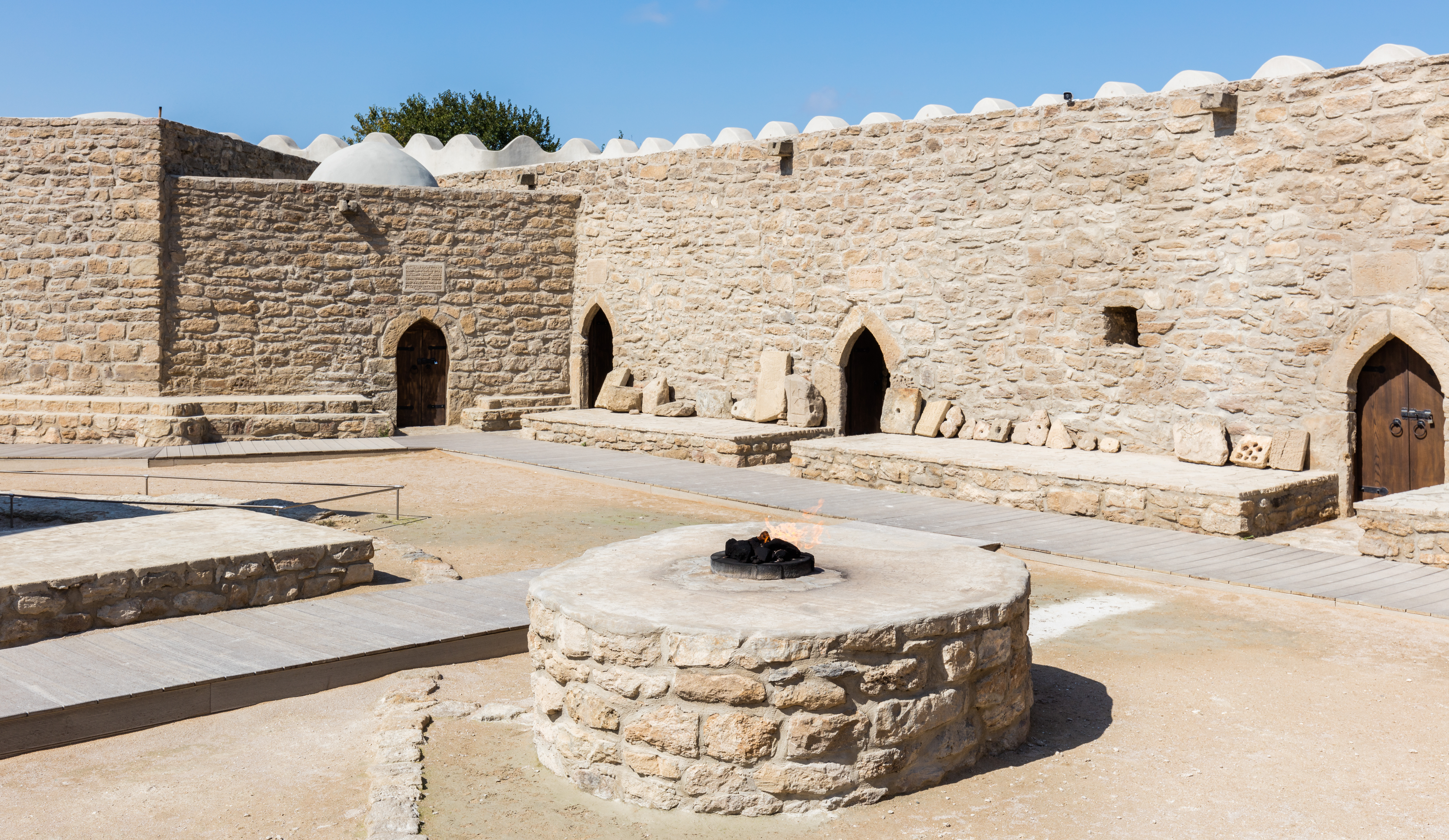
Sacred flame at the Ateshgah of Baku

=== Iranian ===
Iranian religions are ancient religions whose roots predate the Islamization of Greater Iran. Nowadays these religions are practiced only by minorities.

Zoroastrianism is based on the teachings of prophet Zoroaster in the 6th century BCE. Zoroastrians worship the creator Ahura Mazda. In Zoroastrianism, good and evil have distinct sources, with evil trying to destroy the creation of Mazda, and good trying to sustain it.

Kurdish religions include the traditional beliefs of the Yazidi, Alevi, and Ahl-e Haqq. Sometimes these are labeled Yazdânism.

=== New religious movements ===
- The Baháʼí Faith teaches the unity of all religions.
- Cao Đài is a syncretistic, monotheistic religion, established in Vietnam in 1926.
- Eckankar is a pantheistic religion with the purpose of making God an everyday reality in one's life.
- Epicureanism is a Hellenistic philosophy that is considered by many of its practitioners as a type of (sometimes non-theistic) religious identity. It has its own scriptures, a monthly "feast of reason" on the Twentieth and considers friendship to be holy.
- Hindu reform movements, such as Ayyavazhi, Swaminarayan Faith and Ananda Marga, are examples of new religious movements within Indian religions.
- Japanese new religions (shinshukyo) is a general category for a wide variety of religious movements founded in Japan since the 19th century. These movements share almost nothing in common except the place of their founding. The largest religious movements centered in Japan include Soka Gakkai, Tenrikyo, and Seicho-No-Ie among hundreds of smaller groups.
- Jehovah's Witnesses, a non-trinitarian Christian Reformist movement sometimes described as millenarian.
- Neo-Druidism is a religion promoting harmony with nature, named after but not necessarily connected to the Iron Age druids.
- Modern pagan movements attempting to reconstruct or revive ancient pagan practices, such as Heathenry, Hellenism, Roman Traditionalism, and Kemeticism.
- Noahidism is a monotheistic ideology based on the Seven Laws of Noah, and on their traditional interpretations within Rabbinic Judaism.
- Some forms of parody religion or fiction-based religion like Jediism, Pastafarianism, Dudeism, "Tolkien religion", and others often develop their own writings, traditions, and cultural expressions, and end up behaving like traditional religions.
- Satanism is a broad category of religions that, for example, worship Satan as a deity (Theistic Satanism) or use Satan as a symbol of carnality and earthly values (LaVeyan Satanism and The Satanic Temple).
- Scientology is characterised by scholarship in psychology and behavioral sciences as a scam or a commercial business. News sources, politicians and counter-cult organisations have characterised it in similar terms, or as a cult. Academics who study religious movements classify it as a new religious movement or religion. Its mythological framework is similar to a UFO cult and includes references to aliens, but it is kept secret from most followers. It charges a fee for its central activity, on the basis of which it has been characterised as a commercial enterprise.
- UFO Religions in which extraterrestrial entities are an element of belief, such as Raëlism, Aetherius Society, and Marshall Vian Summers's New Message from God.
- Unitarian Universalism is a religion characterized by support for a free and responsible search for truth and meaning, and has no accepted creed or theology.
- Wicca is a neo-pagan religion first popularised in 1954 by British civil servant Gerald Gardner, involving the worship of a God and Goddess.

== Related aspects ==
=== Law ===
The study of law and religion is a relatively new field, with several thousand scholars involved in law schools, and academic departments including political science, religion, and history since 1980. Scholars in the field are not only focused on strictly legal issues about religious freedom or non-establishment, but also study religions as they are qualified through judicial discourses or legal understanding of religious phenomena. Exponents look at canon law, natural law, and state law, often in a comparative perspective. Specialists have explored themes in Western history regarding Christianity and justice and mercy, rule and equity, and discipline and love. Common topics of interest include marriage and the family and human rights. Outside of Christianity, scholars have looked at law and religion links in the Muslim Middle East and pagan Rome.

Studies have focused on secularization. In particular, the issue of wearing religious symbols in public, such as headscarves that are banned in French schools, have received scholarly attention in the context of human rights and feminism.

=== Science ===
Science acknowledges reason and empirical evidence; and religions include revelation, faith and sacredness whilst also acknowledging philosophical and metaphysical explanations with regard to the study of the universe. Both science and religion are not monolithic, timeless, or static because both are complex social and cultural endeavors that have changed through time across languages and cultures.

The concepts of science and religion are a recent invention: the term religion emerged in the 17th century in the midst of colonization, globalization and the Protestant Reformation. The term science emerged in the 19th century out of natural philosophy in the midst of attempts to narrowly define those who studied nature (natural science), and the phrase religion and science emerged in the 19th century due to the reification of both concepts. It was in the 19th century that the terms Buddhism, Hinduism, Taoism, and Confucianism first emerged. In the ancient and medieval world, the etymological Latin roots of both science (scientia) and religion (religio) were understood as inner qualities of the individual or virtues, never as doctrines, practices, or actual sources of knowledge.

In general, the scientific method gains knowledge by testing hypotheses to develop theories through elucidation of facts or evaluation by experiments and thus only answers cosmological questions about the universe that can be observed and measured. It develops theories of the world which best fit physically observed evidence. All scientific knowledge is subject to later refinement, or even rejection, in the face of additional evidence. Scientific theories that have an overwhelming preponderance of favorable evidence are often treated as de facto verities in general parlance, such as the theories of general relativity and natural selection to explain respectively the mechanisms of gravity and evolution.

Religion does not have a method per se partly because religions emerge through time from diverse cultures and it is an attempt to find meaning in the world, and to explain humanity's place in it and relationship to it and to any posited entities. In terms of Christian theology and ultimate truths, people rely on reason, experience, scripture, and tradition to test and gauge what they experience and what they should believe. Furthermore, religious models, understanding, and metaphors are also revisable, as are scientific models.

Regarding religion and science, Albert Einstein states (1940): "For science can only ascertain what is, but not what should be, and outside of its domain value judgments of all kinds remain necessary. Religion, on the other hand, deals only with evaluations of human thought and action; it cannot justifiably speak of facts and relationships between facts...Now, even though the realms of religion and science in themselves are clearly marked off from each other, nevertheless there exist between the two strong reciprocal relationships and dependencies. Though religion may be that which determine the goals, it has, nevertheless, learned from science, in the broadest sense, what means will contribute to the attainment of the goals it has set up."

=== Morality ===
Many religions have value frameworks regarding personal behavior meant to guide adherents in determining between right and wrong. These include the Five Vows of Jainism, Judaism's halakha, Islam's sharia, Catholicism's canon law, Buddhism's Noble Eightfold Path, and Zoroastrianism's good thoughts, good words, and good deeds concept, among others.

Religion and morality are not synonymous. While it is often assumed in Christian thought that morality is ultimately based in religion, it can also have a secular basis.

The study of religion and morality can be contentious due to ethnocentric views on morality, failure to distinguish between in group and out group altruism, and inconsistent definitions of religiosity.

=== Politics ===
==== Impact ====
Religion has had a significant impact on the political system in many countries. Notably, most Muslim-majority countries adopt various aspects of sharia, the Islamic law. Some countries even define themselves in religious terms, such as The Islamic Republic of Iran. The sharia thus affects up to 23% of the global population, or 1.57 billion people who are Muslims. However, religion also affects political decisions in many western countries. For instance, in the United States, 51% of voters would be less likely to vote for a presidential candidate who did not believe in God, and only 6% more likely. Christians made up 92% of members of the US Congress, compared with 71% of the general public (in 2014). At the same time, while 23% of US adults are religiously unaffiliated, only one former member of Congress (Kyrsten Sinema, Arizona), or 0.2% of that body, claims no religious affiliation. In most European countries, however, religion has a much smaller influence on politics although it used to be much more important. For instance, same-sex marriage and abortion were illegal in many European countries until recently, following Christian (usually Catholic) doctrine. Several European leaders are atheists (e.g., France's former president Francois Hollande or Greece's prime minister Alexis Tsipras). In Asia, the role of religion differs widely between countries. For instance, India is still one of the most religious countries and religion still has a strong impact on politics, given that Hindu nationalists have been targeting minorities like the Muslims and the Christians, who historically belonged to the lower castes. By contrast, countries such as China or Japan are largely secular and thus religion has a much smaller impact on politics.

==== Secularism ====
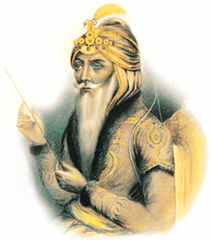
Ranjit Singh established secular rule over Punjab in the early 19th century.

Secularization is the transformation of the politics of a society from close identification with a particular religion's values and institutions toward nonreligious values and secular institutions. The purpose of this is frequently modernization or protection of the population's religious diversity.

=== Economics ===
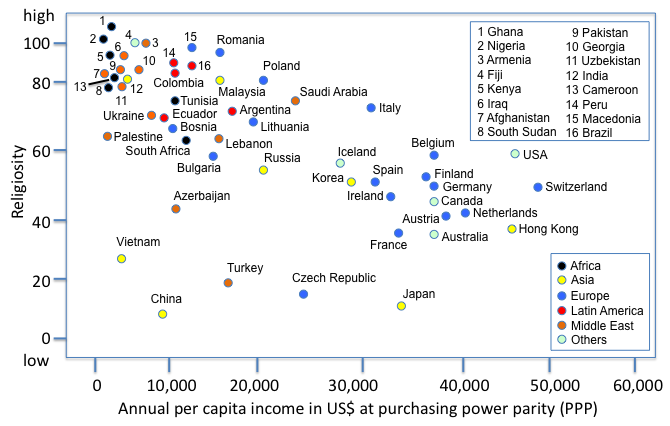
Average income correlates negatively with (self-defined) religiosity.

One study has found there is a negative correlation between self-defined religiosity and the wealth of nations. In other words, the richer a nation is, the less likely its inhabitants to call themselves religious, whatever this word means to them (Many people identify themselves as part of a religion (not irreligion) but do not self-identify as religious).

Sociologist and political economist Max Weber has argued that Protestant Christian countries are wealthier because of their Protestant work ethic. According to a study from 2015, Christians hold the largest amount of wealth (55% of the total world wealth), followed by Muslims (5.8%), Hindus (3.3%) and Jews (1.1%). According to the same study it was found that adherents under the classification Irreligion or other religions hold about 34.8% of the total global wealth (while making up only about 20% of the world population, see section on classification).

=== Health ===
Mayo Clinic researchers examined the association between religious involvement and spirituality, and physical health, mental health, health-related quality of life, and other health outcomes. The authors reported that: "Most studies have shown that religious involvement and spirituality are associated with better health outcomes, including greater longevity, coping skills, and health-related quality of life (even during terminal illness) and less anxiety, depression, and suicide."

The authors of a subsequent study concluded that the influence of religion on health is largely beneficial, based on a review of related literature. According to academic James W. Jones, several studies have discovered "positive correlations between religious belief and practice and mental and physical health and longevity."

An analysis of data from the 1998 US General Social Survey, whilst broadly confirming that religious activity was associated with better health and well-being, also suggested that the role of different dimensions of spirituality/religiosity in health is rather more complicated. The results suggested "that it may not be appropriate to generalize findings about the relationship between spirituality/religiosity and health from one form of spirituality/religiosity to another, across denominations, or to assume effects are uniform for men and women.

=== Violence ===
Critics such as Hector Avalos, Regina Schwartz, Christopher Hitchens, and Richard Dawkins have argued that religions are inherently violent and harmful to society by using violence to promote their goals, in ways that are endorsed and exploited by their leaders.

Anthropologist Jack David Eller asserts that religion is not inherently violent, arguing "religion and violence are clearly compatible, but they are not identical." He asserts that "violence is neither essential to nor exclusive to religion" and that "virtually every form of religious violence has its nonreligious corollary."

==== Animal sacrifice ====
Some (but not all) religions practise animal sacrifice, the ritual killing and offering of an animal to appease or maintain favour with a deity. It has been banned in India.

=== Superstition ===
Greek and Roman pagans, who saw their relations with the gods in political and social terms, scorned the man who constantly trembled with fear at the thought of the gods (deisidaimonia), as a slave might fear a cruel and capricious master. The Romans called such fear of the gods superstitio. Ancient Greek historian Polybius described superstition in ancient Rome as an instrumentum regni, an instrument of maintaining the cohesion of the Empire.

Superstition has been described as the non-rational establishment of cause and effect. Religion is more complex and is often composed of social institutions and has a moral aspect. Some religions may include superstitions or make use of magical thinking. Adherents of one religion sometimes think of other religions as superstition. Some atheists, deists, and skeptics regard religious belief as superstition.

The Roman Catholic Church considers superstition to be sinful in the sense that it denotes a lack of trust in the divine providence of God and, as such, is a violation of the first of the Ten Commandments. The Catechism of the Catholic Church states that superstition "in some sense represents a perverse excess of religion" (para. #2110). "Superstition", it says, "is a deviation of religious feeling and of the practices this feeling imposes. It can even affect the worship we offer the true God, e.g., when one attributes an importance in some way magical to certain practices otherwise lawful or necessary. To attribute the efficacy of prayers or of sacramental signs to their mere external performance, apart from the interior dispositions that they demand is to fall into superstition. Cf. Matthew 23:16–22" (para. #2111)

=== Agnosticism and atheism ===
The terms atheist (lack of belief in gods) and agnostic (belief in the unknowability of the existence of gods), though specifically contrary to theistic (e.g., Christian, Jewish, and Muslim) religious teachings, do not by definition mean the opposite of religious. The true opposite of religious is the word irreligious. Irreligion describes an absence of any religion; antireligion describes an active opposition or aversion toward religions in general. There are religions (including Buddhism and Taoism) that classify some of their followers as agnostic, atheistic, or nontheistic. For example, in ancient India, there were large atheistic movements and traditions (Nirīśvaravāda) that rejected the Vedas, such as the atheistic Ājīvika and the Ajñana which taught agnosticism.

=== Interfaith cooperation ===
Because religion continues to be recognized in Western thought as a universal impulse, many religious practitioners have aimed to band together in interfaith dialogue, cooperation, and religious peacebuilding. The first major dialogue was the Parliament of the World's Religions at the 1893 Chicago World's Fair, which affirmed universal values and recognition of the diversity of practices among different cultures. The 20th century has been especially fruitful in use of interfaith dialogue as a means of solving ethnic, political, or even religious conflict, with Christian–Jewish reconciliation representing a complete reverse in the attitudes of many Christian communities towards Jews.

Recent interfaith initiatives include A Common Word, launched in 2007 and focused on bringing Muslim and Christian leaders together, the "C1 World Dialogue", the Common Ground initiative between Islam and Buddhism, and a United Nations sponsored "World Interfaith Harmony Week".

=== Culture ===
Culture and religion have usually been seen as closely related. Paul Tillich looked at religion as the soul of culture and culture as the form or framework of religion. In his own words:

Religion as ultimate concern is the meaning-giving substance of culture, and culture is the totality of forms in which the basic concern of religion expresses itself. In abbreviation: religion is the substance of culture, culture is the form of religion. Such a consideration definitely prevents the establishment of a dualism of religion and culture. Every religious act, not only in organized religion, but also in the most intimate movement of the soul, is culturally formed.

Ernst Troeltsch, similarly, looked at culture as the soil of religion and thought that, therefore, transplanting a religion from its original culture to a foreign culture would kill it in the same manner that transplanting a plant from its natural soil to an alien soil would kill it. However, there have been many attempts in the modern pluralistic situation to distinguish culture from religion. Domenic Marbaniang has argued that elements grounded on beliefs of a metaphysical nature (religious) are distinct from elements grounded on nature and the natural (cultural). For instance, language (with its grammar) is a cultural element while sacralization of language in which a particular religious scripture is written is more often a religious practice. The same applies to music and the arts.

== Criticism ==
Criticism of religion is criticism of the ideas, the truth, or the practice of religion, including its political and social implications.

== See also ==
- Cosmogony – Theory or model concerning the origin of the universe
- Cult – High-control social group
- Index of religion-related articles – Alphabetical listing of religion related topics
- Life stance – Person's relation with what they accept as being of ultimate importance
- List of foods with religious symbolism
- List of religion-related awards
- List of religious texts
- Matriarchal religion – Religion that focuses on a goddess or goddesses
- Nontheistic religions – Religious thought and practice independent of belief in deities
- Outline of religion – Overview of and topical guide to religion
- Priest – Person authorized to lead the sacred rituals of a religion
- Religion and happiness
- Religious conversion – Adoption of religious beliefs
- Religious discrimination – Treating a person or group differently because of their religious beliefs
- Social conditioning – Sociological process
- Socialization – Lifelong process of inheriting and disseminating norms, customs and ideologies
- Theocracy – Form of government with religious leaders
- Theology of religions

== Sources ==
Primary

- Lao Tzu; Tao Te Ching (Victor H. Mair translator); Bantam (1998).
- The Holy Bible, King James Version; New American Library (1974).
- The Koran; Penguin (2000), ISBN 0-14-044558-7.
- The Origin of Live & Death, African Creation Myths; Heinemann (1966).
- Poems of Heaven and Hell from Ancient Mesopotamia; Penguin (1971).
- Selected Work Marcus Tullius Cicero

Secondary

- Coppens, Yves, Origines de l'homme – De la matière à la conscience, De Vive Voix, Paris, 2010
- Coppens, Yves La preistoria dell'uomo, Jaca Book, Milano, 2011
- Descartes, René; Meditations on First Philosophy; Bobbs-Merrill (1960), ISBN 0-672-60191-5.
- Dow, James W. (2007), A Scientific Definition of Religion Archived 22 October 2021 at the Wayback Machine
- Dundas, Paul (2002) [1992]. The Jains (Second ed.). Routledge. ISBN 978-0-415-26605-5. Archived from the original on 22 January 2017.
- Durant, Will (& Ariel (uncredited)); Our Oriental Heritage; MJF Books (1997), ISBN 1-56731-012-5.
- Durant, Will (& Ariel (uncredited)); Caesar and Christ; MJF Books (1994), ISBN 1-56731-014-1
- Durant, Will (& Ariel (uncredited)); The Age of Faith; Simon & Schuster (1980), ISBN 0-671-01200-2.
- Durkheim, Émile (1915). The Elementary Forms of the Religious Life. London: George Allen & Unwin.
- Geertz, Clifford (1993). "Religion as a cultural system". The interpretation of cultures: selected essays, Geertz, Clifford. London: Fontana Press. pp. 87–125.
- Gimbutas, Marija 1989. The Language of the Goddess. Thames and Hudson New York
- Gonick, Larry; The Cartoon History of the Universe; Doubleday, vol. 1 (1978) ISBN 0-385-26520-4, vol. II (1994) ISBN 0-385-42093-5, W.W. Norton, vol. III (2002) ISBN 0-393-05184-6.
- Haisch, Bernard The God Theory: Universes, Zero-point Fields, and What's Behind It All—discussion of science vs. religion, Red Wheel/Weiser, 2006, ISBN 1-57863-374-5
- James, William (1902). The Varieties of Religious Experience. A Study in Human Nature. Longmans, Green, and Co.
- Khanbaghi, A., The Fire, the Star and the Cross: Minority Religions in Medieval and Early Modern Iran (IB Tauris; 2006) 268 pages. Social, political and cultural history of religious minorities in Iran, c. 226–1722 AD.
- King, Winston, Religion [First Edition]. In: Encyclopedia of Religion. Ed. Lindsay Jones. Vol. 11. 2nd ed. Detroit: Macmillan Reference US, 2005. pp. 7692–7701.
- Korotayev, Andrey, World Religions and Social Evolution of the Old World Oikumene Civilizations: A Cross-cultural Perspective, Lewiston, New York: Edwin Mellen Press, 2004, ISBN 0-7734-6310-0.
- McKinnon, Andrew M. (2002), "Sociological Definitions, Language Games and the 'Essence' of Religion" Archived 4 March 2016 at the Wayback Machine. Method & theory in the study of religion, vol 14, no. 1, pp. 61–83.
- Massignon, Louis (1949). "Les trois prières d'Abraham, père de tous les croyants". Dieu Vivant. 13: 20–23.
- Palmer, Spencer J., et al.. Religions of the World: a Latter-day Saint [Mormon] View. 2nd general ed., tev. and enl. Provo, Utah: Brigham Young University, 1997. xv, 294 p., ill. ISBN 0-8425-2350-2
- Pals, Daniel L. (2006). Eight Theories of Religion. Oxford University Press.
- Ramsay, Michael, Abp. Beyond Religion? Cincinnati, Ohio: Forward Movement Publications, (cop. 1964).
- Saler, Benson; Conceptualizing Religion: Immanent Anthropologists, Transcendent Natives, and Unbounded Categories (1990), ISBN 1-57181-219-9
- Schuon, Frithjof. The Transcendent Unity of Religions, in series, Quest Books. 2nd Quest ... rev. ed. Wheaton, Ill.: Theosophical Publishing House, 1993, cop. 1984. xxxiv, 173 p. ISBN 0-8356-0587-6
- Segal, Robert A (2005). "Theories of Religion". In Hinnells, John R. (ed.). The Routledge Companion to the Study of Religion. London; New York: Routledge. pp. 49–60.
- Stausberg, Michael (2009). Contemporary Theories of religion. Routledge.
- Toropov, Brandon; Buckles, Luke (2011). Guide to World Religions. Penguin.
- Wallace, Anthony F.C. 1966. Religion: An Anthropological View. New York: Random House. (pp. 62–66)
- The World Almanac (annual), World Almanac Books, ISBN 0-88687-964-7.
- The World Almanac (for numbers of adherents of various religions), 2005
