= Commemorative =

A commemorative is an object made to memorialize something.

Commemorative may refer to:

- Commemorative coin, coins that issued to commemorate something
- Commemorative medal, a medal to commemorate something
- Commemorative plaque, a plate typically attached to surface and bearing text or an image related to an honoree
- Commemorative stamp, a postage stamp to honor something

== See also ==
- Commemoration (disambiguation)
- Commemorative Air Force, a Texas-based organization dedicated to preserving and showing historical aircraft
