= Commemoration =

Commemoration may refer to:

- Commemoration (Anglicanism), a religious observance in Churches of the Anglican Communion
- Commemoration (liturgy), insertion in one liturgy of portions of another
- Memorialization
- "Commemoration", a song by the 3rd and the Mortal from the album Painting on Glass

== See also ==
- Commemorative (disambiguation)
