= Mana =

Mana may refer to:

== Religion and mythology ==
- Mana (Oceanic cultures), the spiritual life force energy or healing power that permeates the universe in Melanesian and Polynesian mythology
- Mana (food), archaic name for manna, an edible substance mentioned in the Bible and Quran
- Mana (Mandaeism), a term roughly equivalent to the philosophical concept of 'nous'
- Māna, a Buddhist term for 'pride', 'arrogance', or 'conceit'
- Mana (Finnish mythology), or Tuonela, the realm of the dead or the underworld

== Arts, entertainment and media ==
=== Music ===
- Maná, a Mexican rock group
  - Maná (album), 1987
- Mana (Nemesea album), 2004
- Mana Mana, a Finnish rock group
- Mana Music, a music supervision company based in Australia and New Zealand
- Mana, an album by Idle Hands (band), 2019

=== Other uses in arts, entertainment and media ===
- Mana (gaming), or magic, an attribute assigned to characters in role-playing or video games
- Mana (series), a role-playing game series
- Mana, a title serialized in South Korean manhwa magazine Wink
- Mana (magazine), an Estonian magazine published outside Estonia
- Mana (newspaper), a multi-lingual Polynesian newspaper published in New Zealand

== People ==
=== Musicians ===
- Mana (musician), Japansese guitarist of the band Malice Mizer
- Mana, Finnish drummer of the rock band Lordi
- Mana, Japanese vocalist of the band Chai

=== Other people ===
- Mana (given name), including a list of people and fictional characters with the name
- Mana (skeleton), a 3000-year-old human skeleton discovered in Fiji
- Florent Parfait Mana, Malagasy politician
- Laura Mañá (born 1968), Spanish film director
- Mohammed Mana (1950–2025), Nigerian politician
- Rabbi Mana II, Jewish Amora sage

== Places ==
=== Communities ===
- Mana, Burkina Faso
- Mana (woreda), Ethiopia
- Mana, French Guiana
- Mana, India
- Mana, Orhei, Moldova
- Mana, New Zealand
  - Mana railway station
  - Mana (New Zealand electorate)
- Maná, Corozal, Puerto Rico
- Mana (Ivanjica), Serbia
- Maňa, Slovakia
- La Maná Canton, Ecuador

=== Features ===
- Mana (Russia), a river in Krasnoyarsk Krai
- Mana (French Guiana), a river
- Måna, a river in Tinn, Norway
- Mana Island (Croatia), in Kornati archipelago
- Mana Island (Fiji)
- Mana Island (New Zealand)
- Mana Mountain, Antarctica
- Mana Pass, a mountain pass between India and Tibet
- Mana Peak, a mountain in India

== Other uses ==
- Mana (Jungian psychology), an archetypal figure of the wise old person
- Mana Movement, formerly the Mana Party, in New Zealand
- Mana Party (India)
- Mana College, in Porirua, Wellington, New Zealand
- Illam, or Mana, the house of a Nambudiri Brahmin in Kerala, India; or, metaphorically, the family lineage
- Mana, one of the Nepalese customary units of measurement#Volume

== See also ==
- Mana and Mani, a 1979 children's opera
- MANA (disambiguation)
- MaNa (disambiguation)
- Manas (disambiguation)
- Manna (disambiguation)
- Jana Gana Mana (disambiguation), the national anthem of India
