= Manna (disambiguation) =

Manna is the food produced for the Israelites in the desert, as described in the Biblical Book of Exodus.

Manna or Manna from Heaven may also refer to:

- crystallized products of plant sap, especially when rich in sugars and used as a source of food by people or animals, in particular saps of:
  - manna ash (Fraxinus ornus)
  - European ash (Fraxinus excelsior)
  - narrow-leafed ash (Fraxinus angustifolia)
  - Alhagi maurorum (Alhagi manna)
  - Eucalyptus or Australian manna:
    - Eucalyptus viminalis
    - Eucalyptus gunnii
    - Eucalyptus pulverulenta

== Arts and entertainment ==
- Manam (film), a 2014 Telugu language film
- Manna (album), a 1971 album by the band Bread
- Manna (novel), a novel by Marshall Brain
- "Manna" (short story), a 1949 story by Peter Phillips
- Manna Music Inc, a song publishing company
- The Manna (Poussin), a 1630s painting by Nicolas Poussin
- Manna from Heaven, a 2003 compilation of short stories by Roger Zelazny
- Manna from Heaven (film), a 2002 film
- "Manna from Heaven" (American Crime Story), a 2016 television episode
- "Manna from Heaven" (Bugs), a 1995 television episode

== People ==
- Manna (actor) (1964–2008), Bangladeshi film actor
- Manna Dey (1919–2013), Indian singer and composer
- Manna Naidoo (1948–2022), South African politician
- Manna Singh (1914–1954), Indian field hockey player and officer
- Gennaro Manna (1715–1779), Italian composer
- Zohar Manna (1939–2018), American computer scientist
- Louis Manna (born 1929), American mobster
- Sailen Manna (1924-2012), Indian football player
- Muhammad Manna (born 1938), Pakistani field hockey player
- Haytham Manna, Syrian writer

== Places ==
- Manna (city), a town in Bengkulu, Indonesia
- Manna, or Mannea, ancient Land of Mannaeans, in present-day northwestern Iran
- Manna, Banmauk, a village in Burma
- Manna, Greece, a village in Corinthia
- Dhok Manna, a village in Pakistan

== Other ==
- Manna Aviation, an Australian aircraft manufacturer
- Manna Restaurant, at AdventHealth Castle Rock
- Operations Manna and Chowhound, the 29 April – 7 May 1945 RAF food droppings in the West of the Netherlands at the end of World War II
- Operation Manna, a mid-October 1944 joint British and Greek, partially airborne, operation in Greece; part of World War II
- Manna (horse), winner of the 1925 Epsom Derby
- Manna (gymnastics), a gymnastics skill
- Manna (cicada), a genus of cicadas
- Manna-Dora language, a nearly extinct Dravidian language
- Operations Manna, Chowhound, and Faust, famine-relief operations in World War II
- The Manna Machine, a 1978 non-fiction book by George Sassoon and Rodney Dale
- Dershowitz–Manna ordering, a set ordering in mathematics
- White Manna and White Mana, American restaurants

== See also ==
- Mana (disambiguation)
