= Funerary text =

Death custom in some societies

Funerary texts or funerary literature feature in many belief systems. Its purpose is usually to provide guidance to the newly deceased or the soon-to-be-deceased about how to survive and prosper in the afterlife.

== Antiquity ==
The most famous example of funerary literature is that of the ancient Egyptians, whose Book of the Dead was buried with the deceased to guide him or her through the various trials that would be encountered before being allowed into the afterlife. The Book of the Dead followed a tradition of Egyptian funerary literature that dated back as far as the 26th century BC.

Similar practices were followed by followers of the cult of Orpheus, who lived in southern Italy and Crete in the 6th–1st century BC. Their dead were buried with gold plates or laminae on which were inscribed directions about the afterlife.

In Mandaeism, the Left Ginza and parts of the Qulasta serve as funerary texts.

== Medieval ==
Tibetan Buddhists still make use of the Bardo Thodol (also known as ""Tibetan Book of the Dead"", dating to ca. the 8th century), which describes the experiences of the mind after death. It is recited by lamas over a dying or recently deceased person, or sometimes over an effigy of the deceased.

Pure Land Buddhists regularly recite the Amitabha Sutra, which describes the Buddha Amitabha and Sukhavati, the Western Pure Land, in brief detail. It is ordinarily recited at funerals or at memorial services.

In late 15th-century Europe, the Ars moriendi ("The Art of Dying Well") became one of the most popular and widely circulated early printed books. It was published in Germany around 1470 as a guide to how to meet Death and avoid the temptations (Impatience, Pride, Avarice, etc.) that would consign a soul to purgatory or, worse, to hell.

The Funeral Oration (Halotti beszéd) is the oldest extant record of the Hungarian language, dating back to 1192–1195. (, )

== See also ==
- Bardo Thodol
- Orphic poems and rites
- Ars moriendi
- Left Ginza
