= Psalms of Thomas =

Manichaean Psalms

The Psalms of Thomas (more correctly Psalms of Thom) are a set of third-century psalms found appended to the end of a Coptic Manichaean psalm book, which was in turn part of the Medinet Madi library excavated in 1929. The psalms were originally published in 1938 by Charles Allberry.

The meter and structure of the psalms suggest that they were originally written in Eastern Aramaic. There are 20 psalms in total. The themes and content of the psalms bear a considerable resemblance to the Hymn of the Pearl from the Acts of Thomas.

== Authorship ==
Considerable controversy continues as to whether the Thomas or Thom referred to could be the Apostle Thomas, Mani's disciple, also called Thomas, or the Gnostic concept of the divine twin. This is because the latter is referred to in other parts of the Coptic Manichaean Psalm-book as a distinct person from the Apostle. The enigma has since deepened with the publication of the Cologne Mani-Codex in the 1970s, which showed that Mani himself came out of a baptizing Christian sect called the Elkasaites (= Elcesaites).

== List of psalms ==
List of the titles of the 20 psalms:

1. Concerning the Light
2. Concerning the coming of the Soul
3. Concerning the First Man
4. Concerning the First Man
5. The Soul, which is the First Man
6. Concerning the Living Spirit
7. That of the Living Spirit
8. That of the Envoy
9. That of the Perfect Man
10. Concerning the molding of the ...
11. ... concerning his son
12. ... of the Savior
13. ... the Church unto (?) the Apostle
14. I heard the cry of a physician
15. For a table has been set in the house
16. Salome built a tower
17. The Little one made music by night
18. I reached the door of the garden
19. The vine which grew from the Living ones
20. The cry of Pamoun

== Mandaean parallels ==
In 1949, Torgny Säve-Söderbergh suggested that the psalms were largely based upon canonical Mandaean texts (despite Jesus being mentioned positively in two psalms). Säve-Söderbergh's work on the psalms demonstrating that Mandaeism did not derive from Manichaeism, as was formerly commonly believed. For instance, Psalm 13 has parallels with prayers 125, 129 (cf. Psalms of Thomas 13:1–8), and 155 (cf. Psalms of Thomas 13:37–45) in the Qulasta.

Säve-Söderbergh (1949) notes Mandaean parallels such as the following.

- Psalms 1, 2, 6, 8, 12, and 14 have concluding formulae (e.g., on the victorious return of Light) that are similar to the Mandaean ʿniana ("response") prayers, which are Qulasta prayers 78–103.
- Psalm 2 has parallels with Left Ginza 3.15 (i.e., Hymn 15 in Book 3 of the Left Ginza) (both have "trembling demons" that were defeated).
- In Psalm 5, the phrase "treasure of life" is a parallel of the Mandaean formula "I am a mana of the Great Life," a phrase often found in the numerous hymns of Book 2 of the Left Ginza, including Left Ginza 2.18 and 2.27. In Mandaic, mana (ࡌࡀࡍࡀ) has been variously translated as "mind," "nous," or "treasure." In Mandaeism, Simat Hayyi, the name of a female uthra, also literally translates as "Treasure of Life."
- Psalm 6 directly corresponds with Qulasta prayer 66, which is in turn identical with Left Ginza 3.43.
- Psalm 8 has various Mandaean motifs, such as the capture of demons and the triumph of Light (e.g., Left Ginza 2.15).
- In Psalm 12, phrases such as "the empty one" and "the laden one" have parallels with the end of chapter 47 of the Mandaean Book of John. In the same chapter, phrases such as "ears but would not hear" have parallels in Psalm 14.
- Psalm 13 has parallels with Qulasta prayer 24 and Left Ginza 3.2, 3.22, and 3.41.
- Coptic passage 220 (i.e., Psalm 13) is similar to Qulasta prayer 155, which is the first Saturday rahma (devotional) prayers.
- In Psalm 14, Hylē's answer of co-existing opposites (e.g., "death and life") is similar to Ruha's answer to Dinanukht in Book 6 of the Right Ginza. Both texts also resemble the Nag Hammadi Gnostic poem The Thunder, Perfect Mind.
- In Psalm 17, the "mockery litany," in which aspects of the transient material world are mocked, has parallels with chapter 12 of the Mandaean Book of John.
- Psalm 18 enumerates the senses and limbs, with its text similar to chapter 15 of the Mandaean Book of John, Left Ginza 3.19, and prayer 96 of the Qulasta (identical with Left Ginza 3.2).

The parallels are summarized in the table below.

PsTh	GL	GR	CP	MJ
2	3.15			
5	2			
6	3.43		66	
8	2.15			
12				47
13	3.2,22,41		24, 125, 129, 155	
14		6		47
17				12
18	3.2,19		96	15

These parallels are also discussed in Gelbert & Lofts (2025).

Van Bladel (2017) suggests that an equally plausible scenario is that of Manichaeism and Mandaeism both having borrowed the hymns from another common source, likely the funeral prayer(s) of an Aramaic-speaking Judeo-Christian group in Mesopotamia such as the Elchasites.

There are also parallels between:

- Psalm 15 and Qulasta prayer 373, as well as several prayers following prayer 373
- Psalm 19 and Qulasta prayer 375
