= MANA =

MANA can refer to:

- Mail and News Agent, a former name of Pine (email client)
- Malawi News Agency
- MANA, A National Latina Organization
- Midwives Alliance of North America
- International Center for Materials Nanoarchitectonics
- MANA, a cryptocurrency used in the 3D virtual world Decentraland
- Mana Movement, New Zealand political party

== See also ==
- Mana (disambiguation)
- MaNa (disambiguation)
