= Left Ginza =

Mandaean religious text

Information
- Religion: Mandaeism
- Language: Mandaic language

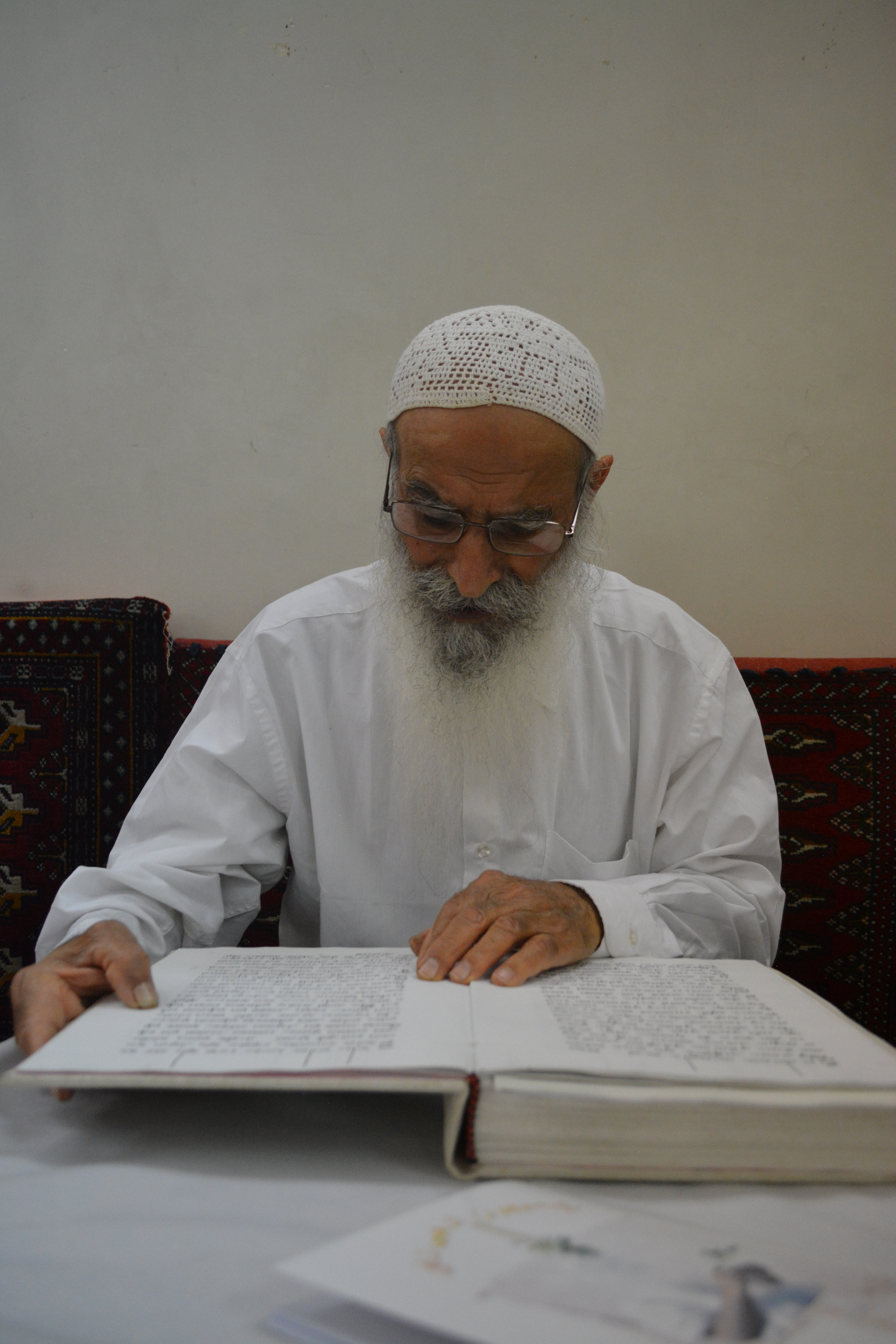
Salem Choheili reading the Left Ginza

The Left Ginza (Classical Mandaic: ࡂࡉࡍࡆࡀ ࡎࡌࡀࡋࡀ, romanized: Ginza Smala) is one of the two parts of the Ginza Rabba, the longest and the most important holy scripture of Mandaeism. The other part of the Ginza Rabba is the Right Ginza.

As of 2024, a critical edition that includes an annotated translation of the Left Ginza is being prepared by Bogdan Burtea and Christoph Markschies.

Summaries of each book (or tractate), based mostly on Häberl (2007), are provided below. Translated excerpts are from Gelbert (2011), which is mostly based on Lidzbarski (1925), while Mandaic transliterations are derived from Gelbert (2011, 2021).

Opening lines of each chapter are provided below, since Mandaeans often refer to Mandaic prayers by their opening lines.

== Book 1 ==
Book 1 is a four-part prose text on the salvation process, beginning with the ascension to heaven of Seth, in advance of his father Adam (compare Sethian Gnosticism).

- Chapter 1.1 is about Adam and his three sons. One of Adam's sons, Sheetil (Seth), volunteers to die before his father. 49 paragraphs in Gelbert (2011). The chapter begins with the opening lines:

Who are the mountains that do not shake (man hinun ṭuria ḏ-lanaidia),
and the heavens of waters that do not change (u-mrumia mia ḏ-la-ništanun)?

- Chapter 1.2 continues the story of Adam after his soul is cast into a material body. 80 paragraphs in Gelbert (2011).
- Chapter 1.3 is about Hawa (Eve) mourning the death of her husband and her encounters with the uthras. It also describes the death of Hawa. 58 paragraphs in Gelbert (2011).
- Chapter 1.4 is a detailed description of the masiqta and the maṭarta (stations) that lie between Earth and the World of Light. 43 paragraphs in Gelbert (2011).

== Book 2 ==
Book 2, poetic, comprises 28 hymns.

All of the hymns in Book 2 of the Left Ginza, in which the mana laments that it has been cast into the physical world, begin with the following refrain:

I am a mana of the Great Life (mana ana ḏ-hiia rbia)
I am a mana of the Mighty Life (mana ana ḏ-hiia rurbia)
I am a mana of the Great Life (mana ana ḏ-hiia rbia)

Since Mandaean priestly commentary texts often refer to hymns and prayers by their opening lines, the opening lines of each of the 28 hymns in the book are provided below. The English translations below are from Gelbert (2011), while the Mandaic transliterations are derived from Gelbert (2011, 2021). Many of the opening lines are repeated but with the individual words ordered differently; in such cases, both versions are provided and are separated by semicolons.

1. Who has let me dwell in the Tibil? / b-gu tibil man ašrian; man ašrian b-gu tibil
2. Who has thrown me into the (place) of secrets and winks? / br azia u-rimzia manu rman; man rman br azia u-rimzia
3. Who has thrown me into the misery of the worlds? / man rman bqiras almia; bqiras alma man rman
4. Who took me out of my treasure-house? / mn bit ginzai man apqan; man apqan mn bit ginzai
5. A son of great radiance, a son of the lustrous glory / br ziua napša, u-br ʿqara taqna
6. I am confirmed through the goodness of my Father / ḏ-mqaiimna b-ṭabuta ḏ-ab; b-ṭabuta ḏ-ab mqaiimna
7. Who threw me into the misfortune of the angels? / b-kariuta ḏ-mlakia manu rman; manu rman b-kariuta ḏ-mlaka
8. I went away in order to come into the world. / ḏ-asgit l-mitia b-alma; asgit b-alma l-mitia
9. Why did my appearance change? / alma šnat dmutai
10. From Thee, my Father, I am learning / minak ab mitaprašna
11. Who has let me dwell in the bodily vestment? / balbuš pagria man ašrun
12. They went and brought me into the Tibil. / asgun l-tibil atiun; asgun atiun l-tibil
13. Who brought me here? / man l-haka atian; man atian l-haka
14. Into this world they sent him / l-hazin alma šadruia
15. Arise, go the house of the Seven! / qum l-bit šuba azil
16. In the reliable treasure he sits / b-ginza taqna iatib
17. There is no treachery or cunning in him / l-itbil aqara u-nikia/nikla
18. Who brought me out of the house of the Life? / mn bit hiia man atian; man atian mn bit hiia
19. There is (something) in me from the treasure of the Life. / mn ginzaihun ḏ-hiia ʿka ʿlai
20. I lived among the hidden fosterers. / binia munqia kasiia huit; huit binia munqia kasiia
21. When did they take me into captivity / ʿmat b-šibia šibiun
22. I was in the hidden treasure-house / bit ginza kasia ʿhuit; ʿhuit bit ginza kasia
23. Who has planted me, sent me away / minṣab man naṣban
24. They brought me out of the house of the Great (Life) / atiun mn bit rbia; I have come in order to raise the stem on high / ʿtit misaq šurbta; ʿtit šurbta misaq
25. Who brought me away from my place? / mn duktai man atian; man atian mn duktai
26. Here I stayed with the generations. / ḏ-haka b-gu daria huit; haka huit b-gu daria
27. Who brought me away from my place? / mn atrai man atian; man atian mn atrai
28. Who brought me away from my place? / mn duktai man atian; man atian mn duktai

== Book 3 ==
Book 3, poetic, comprises 62 hymns, several of which are identical to or based on prayers in the Qulasta. Poems in Book 3 poetically describe the masiqta (ascension) of the soul to World of Light. They typically describe the soul (nišimta) being taken out of the ʿuṣṭuna, or "bodily trunk," and being guided by uthras through the matartas and past Ruha and the Seven Planets, as well as being taken up by the right hand into the World of Light and clothed in radiant garments of light.

The masiqta hymns in Book 3, many of which have close parallels in the Qulasta and Manichaean Psalms of Thomas (e.g., hymns 2-5, 7, 10, 15, 19-20, 22, 27, 41, and 43), are among the oldest Mandaic texts. Van Bladel (2017) suggests that these hymns may have a common Elchasaite source.

Since Mandaean priestly commentary texts often refer to hymns and prayers by their the opening lines, the opening lines of each of the 62 hymns in the book are provided below. The English translations below are from Gelbert (2011), while the Mandaic transliterations are derived from Gelbert (2011, 2021).

1. After the firmament was spread out (abatar ḏ-ʿtingid rqiha)
2. Provided and provisioned I am (zidana u-mzaudana) (see Qulasta prayer 96 and Psalms of Thomas 13, 18)
3. Hail to thee, hail to thee, soul (ṭubak ṭubak nišma) (see Qulasta prayer 94)
4. Go in peace, chosen one, pure one (ʿzil b-šlam bhira dakia) (see Qulasta prayer 92)
5. Repose and peace will prevail (niaha u-šalma nihuia) (see Qulasta prayer 69)
6. Repose and peace prevail (niaha u-šalma nihuia)
7. On the day on which the soul goes out (iuma ḏ-napiq nišma), on the day on which the perfect one ascends on high (iuma ḏ-saliq tušlima) (see Qulasta prayer 98)
8. On the day on which the soul goes forth (iuma ḏ-napiq nišma), on the day on which the perfect one ascends on high (iuma ḏ-saliq tušlima)
9. Between the concealment and the radiance (binia kasia l-ziua), and between the revelation and the hidden place (u-binia galalta l-atar)
10. Among the chosen ones I am the head of the well-versed (riš sabria ana ḏ-bhiria rišaihun ana ḏ-mhamnia) (see Qulasta prayer 93)
11. Let the Great (Life) be mentioned in goodness (dkiria b-ṭabu rbia), let the Mighty (Life) be mentioned in goodness (dkiria b-ṭabu rurbia)
12. How greatly I rejoice (mihdia kma hadina)
13. Faith in the Good came to me (sibra l-ṭab atalia), they say: "thou shalt go forth" (ḏ-amria mipaq napqit).
14. When the darkness was thinking, Adam departed his body (kḏ ʿthašab hšuka, kḏ adam mn pagrḥ npaq)
15. My measure has come to an end and I am heading out (kilai šlim u-napiqna), the spirit speaks to the soul (timar ruha l-nišimta) (see Psalms of Thomas 2)
16. The soul in the fruit of the Life (nišimta b-pira ḏ-hiia)
17. The voice of the soul of the Life I hear (qal nišimta ḏ-hiia šamal)
18. Although a child, my lifespan ended (ianuq šilman kilai)
19. I am standing upon my high place (ʿl ramat qaiiamna), and my eyes look upon the earthly world (u-ainai l-tibil) (see Psalms of Thomas 18)
20. Between the concealment and the radiance (binia kisia l-ziua), between the light and the uthras (u-binia nhura l-ʿutria) (see Qulasta prayer 68)
21. The soul is going out (mipaq npiq nišma); her measure is full, and her time has come (kilḥ šlim, u-zibnḥ mṭa).
22. I am redeemed, my measure is full (ʿtparaq slim kʿlai) (see Psalms of Thomas 13)
23. A voice called out from the heights (qala qra mn rmuma)
24. I passed by the gate of the prisoners (ʿl bab ʿsiria hilpit)
25. I have a soul in the Tibil (nišma ʿtlia b-tibil); she is dying and sleeping in the world; she is dying and sleeping in the world (mkalal u-šakib b-alma; mkalal b-alma u-šakib)
26. Whose soul is this (hazin nišma ḏ-manu), who is edified and cultivated (ḏ-hazin bnina u-mbanana)?
27. It is a sealed letter (ʿngirta mhatamta) which goes out of the world (ḏ-napqa minḥ mn alma) (see Qulasta prayer 73)
28. I am going out from my body (mn pagrai napiqna)
29. I was saved, my measure was full (ʿtparqit šilman kʿlai)
30. At the garden gate I passed by (ʿl baba ginta hilpit), I heard the voice of the gardener (qala ḏ-br ginaiia šimit).
31. At the door of the house of detention (ʿl baba ḏ-bit raina), the radiance of Sunday (habšaba) passed by (ziua ḏ-habšaba hlip).
32. When will my measure be full (lʿmat nišlam kʿlai)
33. What do the good ones look like (l-mahu damin ṭabia), when they go out of their body (kḏ napqia mn pagraihun)?
34. Whose soul is this (hazin nišma ḏ-manu), who is edified and cultivated (ḏ-haizin bnina u-mbanna)?
35. She (the soul) spoke: They arranged me in (the order) of the Life (malil b-hiia sidrun).
36. My measure is full and I am heading out (kilai šlim u-napiqna).
37. As a child my lifespan ended (ianuq kilai šlim)
38. The sound, the sound of a sound (qala qal qala)
39. Good is the Truth for the good one (miṭab kušṭa l-ṭaba)
40. I hear the voice of the soul (qal nišimta šamana)
41. [I am] a mana from the house of the Great (Life) ([ana] mana ḏ-mn bit rbia) (see Psalms of Thomas 13)
42. The soul, the soul of the Life speaks (nišma, nišimta ḏ-hiia amar), Who held me down in the earthly world (b-tibil man sakakan)?
43. I came to my end and am sleeping (mkalalna u-šakibna) (see Qulasta prayer 66 and Psalms of Thomas 6)
44. My measure has come to an end and I am heading out (kilai šlim u-napiqna)
45. As a child, my lifespan ended (ianuq šilman kʿlai)
46. The mana weeps through the generations (mana b-daria bakia)
47. The mana speaks to the generations (mana b-daria amar), I am a circlet of beryl (klila ḏ-balura ana)
48. I am a good one, a son of the Great (Life) I am (ṭaba ana br rbia)
49. A great radiance am I (ziua ana rba)
50. Out of a righteous place (mn atar zadiq)
51. My soul longed for the Life (nišmat šiltan hiia)
52. How long hast thou been standing here (ʿdilma hazin qaimit)?
53. I passed by the door of the prisoners (l-bab ʿsiria hilpit)
54. O ye birds of the carob trees (ia ṣipria hurbia) (see also Tree of Jiva and Atman in Hinduism)
55. At the construction (ʿlḥ ḏ-biniana), at the beginning of the whole construction (l-riša ḏ-kulḥ qumta)
56. My measure has come to an end and I am heading out (kilai šlim u-napiqna), an expert (sabra) who has learnt from the watchful ones (sabra ḏ-mn ḏ-ʿria)
57. I hear the voice of a soul (qala ḏ-hda nišimta), who is tearing herself away from the dwelling of the evil ones (gabra ḏ-ʿtpaqad ʿlai)
58. I hear the voice of a soul (qala ḏ-hda nišimta šamana), who is going out from the body of grossness (ḏ-mn pagra ḏ-lupatḥ napqa)
59. One of children of kušṭa (had mn bnia kušṭa)
60. A being of radiance, I am a son of a being of radiance (ziua ana br ziuia), I am a being of radiance, a son of the Mighty (Life) (ziua ana br rurbia)
61. Whom and whom, soul didst thou (l-man u-l-man šamišt)
62. At the door of the house of the Abaddons (ʿl baba ḏ-bit ʿbdunia), a throne for the spirit is set up (kursia ʿl ʿluana rmia)

Hymns 17 and 58 contain the following refrain:

Naked they brought me into the world (arṭil l-alma atalḥ),

and naked they take me out of it (u-riqan minḥ apqun).

Naked they take me out of it (riqan apqun minḥ),

like a bird that is unaccompanied by anything (kḏ ṣipra ḏ-minḥ lalua).

Hymns 18, 37, and 45 all contain variations of the opening line, "As a child, my lifespan ended" (ianuq šilman kʿlai).

Hymn 62 contains the refrain, "Come, fall into the vessel (mana)" (atun l-mana pil; atun pil l-mana).

== Colophon ==
Book 3 of the Left Ginza is followed by a colophon. There is only one colophon in the Left Ginza, whereas the Right Ginza has six colophons.

Shlama beth Qidra is the earliest Mandaean scribe named in the Left Ginza's colophon. Zazai of Gawazta (fl. 270 AD) is not mentioned in the Left Ginza's colophon, although he is an important figure mentioned in the Right Ginza's colophons.

== External parallels ==
=== Qulasta ===
Several of the prayers in Drower's 1959 Canonical Prayerbook of the Mandaeans (CP), mostly ʿniania ("responses") and masiqta prayers, correspond to hymns in Book 3 of the Left Ginza (GL 3):

GL chapter	CP prayer
3.2	96
3.3	94
3.4	92
3.5 (many lines)	69
3.7	98
3.10	93
3.20	68
3.27	73
3.43	66

=== Psalms of Thomas ===
Several of the Left Ginza hymns correspond to some of the Psalms of Thomas.

GL chapter	Psalms of Thomas
3.2	13, 18
3.15	2
3.22	13
3.41	13
3.43	6

Below is a comparison of Psalm of Thomas 6 and Left Ginza 3.43 (= Qulasta prayer 66).

Psalm of Thomas 6

I was clothed, as I stood,
in a robe without spot,
a robe without spot,
wherein there was no waning or diminution ever.
The living ones passed my cry ...
my care, I arose;
they grasped ... me to that which ...
gave to me;
the light no longer ...
they said to me, "Thou ... the light" ... full of light;
when the light therefore goes to its place
the darkness shall fall and not rise again henceforth.

Left Ginza 3.43

I came to my end and am sleeping in a garment,
which is without a defect,
in a garment in which the defects are none;
no blemish nor deficiency is in it.
The Life knew about me;
Adam, who was sleeping, awoke.
He grasped me by the palm of my right (hand)
and did [not] put a palm branch (baiin) in my hand. (Note: "Palm branch" and [not] are from CP 66 in Drower (1959), since Left Ginza 3.43 corresponds with CP 66.)
He cast light into the darkness
and the darkness was filled with light.
On the day when the light ascends on high,
the darkness will turn back to its place.

Mandaic transliteration
(Qulasta 66)

b-ˁuṣṭla ḏ-muma lit-bẖ
b-ˁuṣṭla ḏ-lit-bẖ muma
u-laiit b-gauẖ
hasir u-bṣir
hiia ˁdun ˁlai
adam ḏ-šakib ˁtar
ligṭan b-pras iamina
u-la-ˁhablia baiin b-iad
nhura rman b-hšuka
u-hšuka ba-nhura ˁtimlia
iuma ḏ-nhura saliq
nitkamar hšuka l-atrẖ

=== Theodore bar Konai ===
Theodore bar Konai, c. 792 in the Book of the Scholion (Syriac: Kṯāḇā d-ʾeskoliyon), quotes the following passage as part of the teachings of the Kentaeans. The passage has close parallels with much of Left Ginza 3.11.

Book of the Scholion

I am hastening and going to the souls.
When they saw me, they assembled before me.
They greeted me a thousand times and wailed and said to me,
‘O Son of Light, go and say to our Father,
"When will those in bonds be set free?
When will relief come to the pained who are in pain?
When will relief come to the souls who bear difficulty in Tibil?"’

I spoke and said to them,
‘When the Euphrates goes dry at its mouth,
and the Tigris dries from its stream,
and all the rivers dry up,
and all the stream-beds are leveled,
then relief will come to the souls.’

Left Ginza 3.11

I recite hymns and go along
to all the souls.
When they caught sight of me,
they assembled themselves and came out towards me.
They assembled themselves and came out towards me,
and they all greeted me.
They speak: "Son of the Good One! Speak to thy Father:
when will the captives be redeemed
When will the captives be redeemed
and will those who are anxious be relieved?"

"Before I speak to my father,
I will say it to you:
...
until the Euphrates dries up at its mouth
and the Tigris changes its course,
until all the seas dry up
and all the rivers, brooks and springs have overflowed
There will be relief for the souls
who live here in the house of trial (purgatory)."

== See also ==
- Ginza Rabba
- Right Ginza
- Book of Genesis
- Psalms
- Bardo Thodol in Tibetan Buddhism
- Book of the Dead in Ancient Egyptian religion
- Funerary text
- Near-death experience, descriptions of which often resemble the contents of the Left Ginza
