= MaNa =

MaNa may refer to:

- Maňa, a village in Slovakia
- MaNa (gamer), a Polish player for Team Liquid
- Ma-Na, a Japanese compilation album

== See also ==
- Mana (disambiguation)
- MANA (disambiguation)
