= Zazai of Gawazta =

3rd-century Mandaean priest and scribe

Rishama Zazai of Gawazta
- ࡆࡀࡆࡀࡉ ࡖࡂࡀࡅࡀࡆࡕࡀ

Personal life
- Born: 3rd century AD
- Died: late 3rd century AD?
- Known for: One of the earliest known copyists of Mandaean texts
- Other name: Zazai ḏ-Gawazta br Hawa
- Occupation: Mandaean priest

Religious life
- Religion: Mandaeism

Zazai of Gawazta (Zazai ḏ-Gawazta, Classical Mandaic: ࡆࡀࡆࡀࡉ ࡖࡂࡀࡅࡀࡆࡕࡀ, Modern Mandaic pronunciation: [ˈzazej əd ˈgævæzta]; also Zazai ḏ-Gawazta bar Hawa, Classical Mandaic: ࡆࡀࡆࡀࡉ ࡖࡂࡀࡅࡀࡆࡕࡀ ࡁࡓ ࡄࡀࡅࡀ, lit. 'Zazai of Gawazta, son of Hawa' or Zazai of Gawazta, son of Naṭar) was a 3rd-century Mandaean priest. He is listed as the first copyist in the colophons of many Mandaean texts.

Zazai of Gawazta is mentioned as the first copyist in the Qulasta colophons 1 (CP 1–74), 4 (CP 104–169), 5 (CP 170–199), and 8 (CP 305–329) of DC 53. He is also attested in the colophons of 1012 Questions, Scroll of Exalted Kingship, Baptism of Hibil Ziwa, Zihrun Raza Kasia, Alma Rišaia Zuṭa, and Dmut Kušṭa. In the colophon of the Left Ginza, Zazai's son and/or initiate Ṭabia (lit. 'gazelle') is listed as a copyist, but not Zazai himself.

Zazai of Gawazta was a contemporary of Sasanian Emperor Bahram I (r. 271–274), who persecuted non-Zoroastrian minorities and was known for his execution of Mani. Zazai of Gawazta's role in initiating the systematic codification of Mandaean texts can be seen as an effort to protect Mandaeism during a time of intense religious persecution.

== See also ==
- Anush bar Danqa
- Bahram I
- Shlama beth Qidra
