= Hymn of the Pearl =

Passage of the apocryphal Acts of Thomas

The Hymn of the Pearl (also Hymn of the Soul, Hymn of the Robe of Glory or Hymn of Judas Thomas the Apostle) is a passage of the apocryphal Acts of Thomas. In that work, originally written in Syriac, the Apostle Thomas sings the hymn while praying for himself and fellow prisoners. Some scholars believe the hymn predates the Acts, as it only appears in one Syriac manuscript and one Greek manuscript of the Acts of Thomas. The author of the Hymn is unknown, though there is a belief that it was composed by the Syriac gnostic Bardaisan from Edessa due to some parallels between his life and that of the hymn. It is believed to have been written in the 2nd century or even possibly the 1st century, and shows influences from heroic folk epics from the region.The vocabulary of the hymn is replete with evocative Parthian loanwords.

== Synopsis ==
The hymn tells the story of a boy, "the son of the king of kings", who is sent from Parthia (Northeastern Iran) to Egypt to retrieve a pearl from a serpent. During the quest, he is seduced by Egyptians and forgets his origin and his family. However, a letter is sent from the king of kings to remind him of his past. When the boy receives the letter, he remembers his mission, retrieves the pearl and returns. That the boy is implicitly Thomas rather than Jesus is indicated by the eventual assertion that he is next in line to his elder brother, this unnamed brother not otherwise mentioned in the text.

== Interpretation ==
The hymn is commonly interpreted as a Gnostic view of the human condition, that we are spirits lost in a world of matter and forgetful of our true origin. This state of affairs may be ameliorated by a revelatory message delivered by a messenger, a role generally ascribed to Jesus. The letter thus takes on a symbolic representation of gnosis.

The hymn has been preserved and especially treasured in Manichaeism – a version of it appears as part of a Coptic Manichaean psalm book and is called the Psalms of Thomas. The Hymn of the Pearl has also been admired by Orthodox Christian thinkers and members of the Church of Jesus Christ of Latter-day Saints.

== Extracts from the text ==
The following text is from Wikisource, which contains the full text of the hymn.

When I was a little child,
and dwelling in my kingdom of my father's house,
and in the riches and luxuries of my teachers,
I was living at ease.

[Then] from our home in the East,
after they had made preparations,
my parents sent me forth.

[...]

Then they made with me an agreement,
and they inscribed it in my heart so that it would not be forgotten:
"If [you would go] down into Egypt
and bring [back] the one pearl,
which is in the middle of the sea
surrounded by the hissing serpent,
then you will put on your glorious garment
and your toga which rests (is laid) over it.
And with your brother, our second in command,
you will be heir in our kingdom."

[...]

I went straight to the serpent,
around its lodging I settled
until it was going to slumber and sleep,
that I might snatch my pearl from it.
Then I became single and alone,
to my fellow-lodgers I became a stranger.

[...]

But in some way or another,
they perceived that I was not of their country.
So they mingled their deceit with me,
and they made me eat their food.
I forgot that I was a son of kings,
and I served their king.
And I forgot the pearl,
on account of which my parents had sent me.
Because of the burden of their exhortations,
I fell into a deep sleep.

But [because of] all these things which happened to me,
my parents perceived [my oppression], and were grieved for me.
[...]
And they wrote a letter to me,
and every noble signed his name on it.

"From your father, the king of kings,
and your mother, the governor of the East,
and from your brother, our second in command,
to you, our son, who is in Egypt, peace.
Awake and arise from your sleep,
and hear the words of our letter.
Remember that you are a son of kings,
consider the slavery you are serving.
Remember the pearl,
on account of which you were sent to Egypt.
Think of your glorious garment,
remember your splendid toga,
which you will put on and wear
when your name is called out from the book of the combatants (athletes).
And with your brother, our viceroy,
With him, you will be in our kingdom."

[...]

I remembered that I was a son of kings,
and my free soul longed for its natural state.
I remembered the pearl,
on account of which I was sent to Egypt.
Then I began charming it,
the formidable and hissing serpent.
I caused it to slumber and to fall asleep,
for my father's name I named over it,
and the name of our second in command (our double),
and of my mother, the queen of the East.
Then I snatched away the pearl,
and I turned to go back to my father's house.
And their filthy and unclean clothing,
I stripped off and left it in their country.

[...]

and my glorious garment which I had stripped off,
and my toga which was wrapped with it,
(from Ramatha and Reken), from the heights of Hyrcania,
my parents sent it there,
with the hand of their stewards,
who, on account of their faithfulness, could be trusted with it.

[...]

I clothed [myself] with it and ascended,
to the palace of peace and worship.
I bowed my head and worshipped him,
the brightness of my father who sent it to me.
Because I had done his commandments,
so also he did what he had promised.
And in the palace of his scribes
I mingled with his teachers,
because he rejoiced in me and received me,
and I was with him and in his kingdom.
And with the voice of praise,
all his servants were praising him.
And he also promised that to the palace
of the king of kings I will hasten with him.
And with my offering and with my pearl,
I should appear with him before our king.

== Uses in art and media ==
- Hymn of the Pearl (Choral Composition) composed by Kevin Anthony and performed by BYU Singers.
- Kenogaia: a Gnostic tale (Book) by David Bentley Hart
