= Ātman (Hinduism) =

Hindu concept for inner self or essence as mere consciousness

Ātman (/ˈɑːtmən/; Sanskrit: आत्मन्) in Hinduism is the true, innermost essence or self of a living being, conceived as eternal and unchanging. (Note: Definitions: Oxford Dictionaries, Oxford University Press (2012), Atman: "1. real self of the individual; 2. a person's soul"; John Bowker (2000), The Concise Oxford Dictionary of World Religions, Oxford University Press, ISBN 978-0192800947, Atman: "the real or true Self"; W.J. Johnson (2009), A Dictionary of Hinduism, Oxford University Press, ISBN 978-0198610250, See entry for Atman (self).; Encyclopedia Britannica, Atman: Atman, (Sanskrit: "self," "breath") one of the most basic concepts in Hinduism, the universal self, identical with the eternal core of the personality that after death either transmigrates to a new life or attains release (moksha) from the bonds of existence."; Shepard (1991): "Usually translated "Soul" but better rendered "Self.""; John Grimes (1996), A Concise Dictionary of Indian Philosophy, State University of New York Press, ISBN 0791430685, Atman: "breath" (from the verb root at = "to breathe"); inner Self, the Reality which is the substrate of the individual and identical with the Absolute (Brahman).; The Presence of Shiva (1994), Stella Kramrisch, Princeton University Press, ISBN 9780691019307, Atma (Glossary) p. 470 "the Self, the inmost Self or, the life principle") Atman is conceptually closely related to the individual self, Jīvātman, which persists across multiple bodies and lifetimes, but different from the self-idea or ego (Ahamkara), the emotional aspect of the mind (Citta), and the bodily or natural aspects (prakṛti). The term is often translated as soul, (Note: While often translated as "soul," it is better translated as "self": Lorenzen (2004, pp. 208–209): "individual soul (aatman) [sic]"; King (1995, p. 64): "Atman as the innermost essence or soul of man."; Meister (2010, p. 63): Atman (soul)"; Shepard (1991): "Usually translated "Soul" but better rendered "Self."") but is better translated as "Self" or essence. To attain moksha (liberation), a human being must acquire self-knowledge (Atmajnana or Brahmajnana).

The six orthodox schools of Indian philosophy have different views on what this self is. In Samkhya and Yoga, which call the essence purusha, and in Advaita Vedanta, the essence is pure consciousness or witness-consciousness (sakshi), beyond identification with phenomena. In Samkhya and Yoga there are innumerable selves, while in Advaita Vedanta there is only one Self. Prominent views in Vedanta on the relation between (Jīv)Atman and the supreme Self (Paramātmā) or Ultimate Reality (Brahman) are that atman and Brahman are simultaneously different and non-different (Bhedabheda), non-different (Advaita, 'not-two'), different with dependence (Dvaita, 'dualist'), or non-different but with dependence (Vishishtadvaita, qualified non-dualism.

The six orthodox schools of Hinduism believe that there is Ātman in every living being (jiva), which is distinct from the body-mind complex. This is a major point of difference with the Buddhist doctrine of Anatta, which holds that in essence there is no unchanging essence or Self to be found in the empirical constituents of a living being, (Note: Atman and Buddhism: Wynne (2011, pp. 103–105): "The denial that a human being possesses a "self" or "soul" is probably the most famous Buddhist teaching. It is certainly its most distinct, as has been pointed out by G. P. Malalasekera: "In its denial of any real permanent Soul or Self, Buddhism stands alone." A similar modern Sinhalese perspective has been expressed by Walpola Rahula: "Buddhism stands unique in the history of human thought in denying the existence of such a Soul, Self or Ātman." The "no Self" or "no soul" doctrine (Sanskrit: anātman; Pāli: anattan) is particularly notable for its widespread acceptance and historical endurance. It was a standard belief of virtually all the ancient schools of Indian Buddhism (the notable exception being the Pudgalavādins), and has persisted without change into the modern era. [...] both views are mirrored by the modern Theravādin perspective of Mahasi Sayadaw that "there is no person or soul" and the modern Mahāyāna view of the fourteenth Dalai Lama that "[t]he Buddha taught that [...] our belief in an independent self is the root cause of all suffering"."; Collins (1994, p. 64): "Central to Buddhist soteriology is the doctrine of not-self (Pali: anattā, Sanskrit: anātman, the opposed doctrine of ātman is central to Brahmanical thought). Put very briefly, this is the [Buddhist] doctrine that human beings have no soul, no self, no unchanging essence."; Plott (2000, p. 62): "The Buddhist schools reject any Ātman concept. As we have already observed, this is the basic and ineradicable distinction between Hinduism and Buddhism."; The notion of no-self is not so much a doctrine, as it is a 'technique' to disidentify from any sorrowfull existent, akin to the Samkhya-notion of Kaivalya: Jayatilleke (1963, pp. 246–249, from note 385 onwards) refers to various notions of "self" or "soul" rejected by early Buddhism; several Buddhist texts record Samkhya-like notions of Atman c.q. consciousness being different from the body, and liberation is the recognition of this difference.; Javanaud (2013): "When Buddhists assert the doctrine of 'no-self', they have a clear conception of what a self would be. The self Buddhists deny would have to meet the following criteria: it would (i) retain identity over time, (ii) be permanent (that is, enduring), and (iii) have 'controlling powers' over the parts of a person. Yet through empirical investigation, Buddhists conclude that there is no such thing. 'I' is commonly used to refer to the mind/body integration of the five skandhas, but when we examine these, we discover that in none alone are the necessary criteria for self met, and as we've seen, the combination of them is a convenient fiction [...] Objectors to the exhaustiveness claim often argue that for discovering the self the Buddhist commitment to empirical means is mistaken. True, we cannot discover the self in the five skandhas, precisely because the self is that which is beyond or distinct from the five skandhas. Whereas Buddhists deny the self on grounds that, if it were there, we would be able to point it out, opponents of this view, including Sankara of the Hindu Advaita Vedanta school, are not at all surprised that we cannot point out the self; for the self is that which does the pointing rather than that which is pointed at. Buddha defended his commitment to the empirical method on grounds that, without it, one abandons the pursuit of knowledge in favour of speculation."; Liberation (nirvana) is not attained by a "self," but is the release of anything that could be "self": Collins1990, p. 82): "It is at this point that the differences [between Upanishads and Abhidharma] start to become marked. There is no central self which animates the impersonal elements. The concept of nirvana (Pali nibbana), although similarly the criterion according to which ethical judgements are made and religious life assessed, is not the liberated state of a self. Like all other things and concepts (dhamma) it is anatta, not-self [in Buddhism]."; McClelland (2010, pp. 16–18): "Anatman/Anatta. Literally meaning no (an-) self or soul (-atman), this Buddhist term applies to the denial of a metaphysically changeless, eternal and autonomous soul or self. (...) The early canonical Buddhist view of nirvana sometimes suggests a kind of extinction-like (kataleptic) state that automatically encourages a metaphysical no-soul (self).") intentionally ambiguous on what it is that is liberated. While essentialist positions are seemingly found in Buddhism, such as in Madhyamika (sunyata) and Yogachara ('mere representation'), presenting broad similarities to non-dualist traditions of Hinduism, the concept of ātman remains anathema to the foundations of Buddhism.

== Etymology and meaning ==
=== Etymology ===
Ātman (Atma, आत्मा, आत्मन्) is a Sanskrit word that refers to "essence, breath, soul." (Note: Atman Britannica, Atman Hindu philosophy) (Note: Atman Etymology Dictionary, Douglas Harper (2012)) It is thought to be derived from the reconstructed hypothetical Proto-Indo-European word *etmen "breath" (a root found in Sanskrit and Germanic; source also of Old English æðm, Dutch adem, Old High German atum "breath," Old English eþian, Dutch ademen "to breathe").

=== Meaning ===
Olivelle notes that ātman "has many meanings and usages in the Upanisadic vocabulary," including "Self," "the ultimate essence of a human being," but is also used to refer to "a living, breathing body," and as reflexive pronoun, akin to "myself."

In contemporary Hinduism, Ātman means "real Self" of the individual, "innermost essence." Atman refers to the essence of human beings that persists amid change, distinct from the ever-evolving embodied individual being (jiva) embedded in material reality. Embodied personality can change while Atman does not. In Advaita Vedanta, it is the observing pure consciousness or witness-consciousness, "pure, undifferentiated, self-shining consciousness," while in Neo-Advaita it is also the nonconceptual insight that 'being' cannot be grasped in words or deeds. (Note: See Neti neti, Neo-Advaita, and Nisargadatta Maharaj)

While often translated as "soul", it is better translated as "self." As such, it is different from non-Hindu notions of soul, which includes consciousness but also the mental abilities of a living being, such as reason, character, feeling, consciousness, memory, perception and thinking. In Hinduism, these are all included in embodied reality, the counterpart of Atman.

== Development of the concept ==
=== Vedas ===
The earliest use of the word Ātman in Indian texts is found in the Rig Veda (RV X.97.11). Yāska, the ancient Indian grammarian, commenting on this Rigvedic verse, accepts the following meanings of Ātman: the pervading principle, the organism in which other elements are united and the ultimate sentient principle.

Other hymns of Rig Veda where the word Ātman appears include I.115.1, VII.87.2, VII.101.6, VIII.3.24, IX.2.10, IX.6.8, and X.168.4.

=== Upanishads ===
Ātman is a central topic in all of the Upanishads, and "know your Ātman" is a recurring principle throughout. The Upanishads describe the atman as both "the ultimate essence of the universe" and "the vital breath in human beings", which is an "imperishable Divine within" that is neither born nor dies.

The Upanishads express two distinct, divergent themes on the relation between Atman and Brahman. Some teach that Brahman (highest reality; universal principle; being-consciousness-bliss) is identical with Ātman, while others teach that Ātman is part of Brahman but not identical to it. This ancient debate developed into various dual and non-dual theories in Hinduism. The Brahmasutra by Badarayana (~100 BCE) synthesized and unified these conflicting theories, stating that Atman and Brahman are different in some respects, particularly during the state of ignorance, but at the deepest level and in the state of self-realization, Atman and Brahman are identical, non-different (advaita). According to Koller, this synthesis countered the dualistic tradition of Samkhya-Yoga schools and realism-driven traditions of Nyaya-Vaiseshika schools, allowing it to emerge as the foundation of Vedanta as Hinduism's most influential spiritual tradition.

According to several Upaniṣadic texts, the atman is present within the human body, extending even to the extremities such as the tips of the nails (Brihadaranyaka Upanishad 1.4.7). Although the atman pervades the entire body, the Upanishads often emphasize the heart, not as a physical organ but as an inner "cave" or guha, as the atman's special locus. It is described as lying deep within the heart (Chandogya Upanishad III.14.3-4).

==== Brihadaranyaka Upanishad ====
The Brihadaranyaka Upanishad (800-600 BCE) describes Atman as that in which everything exists, which is of the highest value, which permeates everything, which is the essence of all, bliss and beyond description. In hymn 4.4.5, Brihadaranyaka Upanishad describes Atman as Brahman, and describes the self as made of everything, including the functions, elements and desires:

That Atman (self, soul) is indeed Brahman. It [Ātman] is also identified with the intellect, the Manas (mind), and the vital breath, with the eyes and ears, with earth, water, air, and ākāśa (sky), with fire and with what is other than fire, with desire and the absence of desire, with anger and the absence of anger, with righteousness and unrighteousness, with everything — it is identified, as is well known, with this (what is perceived) and with that (what is inferred). As it [Ātman] does and acts, so it becomes: by doing good it becomes good, and by doing evil it becomes evil. It becomes virtuous through good acts, and vicious through evil acts. Others, however, say, "The self is identified with desire alone. What it desires, so it resolves; what it resolves, so is its deed; and what deed it does, so it reaps.

— Brihadaranyaka Upanishad 4.4.5, 9th century BCE

The theme of acquiring knowledge of Brahman, and thereby becoming godlike, is extensively repeated in Brihadāranyaka Upanishad. Not even gods can prevail over such a liberated man, to their dismay. For example, in hymn 1.4.10,

Brahman was this before; therefore it knew even the Ātma (soul, himself). I am Brahman, therefore it became all. And whoever among the gods had this enlightenment, also became That. It is the same with the sages, the same with men. Whoever knows the self as "I am Brahman," becomes all this universe. Even the gods cannot prevail against him, for he becomes their Ātma. Now, if a man worships another god, thinking: "He is one and I am another," he does not know. He is like an animal to the gods. As many animals serve a man, so does each man serve the gods. Even if one animal is taken away, it causes anguish; how much more so when many are taken away? Therefore it is not pleasing to the gods that men should know this.

— Brihadaranyaka Upanishad 1.4.10

==== Chandogya Upanishad ====
The Chandogya Upanishad (7th-6th c. BCE) explains Ātman as that which appears to be separate between two living beings but isn't, that essence and innermost, true, radiant self of all individuals which connects and unifies all. Hymn 6.10 explains it with the example of rivers, some of which flow to the east and some to the west, but ultimately all merge into the ocean and become one. In the same way, the individual souls are pure being, states the Chandogya Upanishad; an individual soul is pure truth, and an individual soul is a manifestation of the ocean of one universal soul.

==== Katha Upanishad ====
Along with the Brihadāranyaka, all the earliest and middle Upanishads discuss Ātman as they build their theories to answer how man can achieve liberation, freedom and bliss. The Katha Upanishad (5th to 1st century BCE) explains Atman as the imminent and transcendent innermost essence of each human being and living creature, that this is one, even though the external forms of living creatures manifest in different forms. Hymn 2.2.9 states:

As the one fire, after it has entered the world, though one, takes different forms according to whatever it burns, so does the internal Ātman of all living beings, though one, takes a form according to whatever He enters and is outside all forms.

— Katha Upanishad, 2.2.9

Katha Upanishad, in Book 1, hymns 3.3-3.4, describes the widely cited proto-Samkhya analogy of chariot for the relation of "Soul, Self" to body, mind and senses. Stephen Kaplan translates these hymns as, "Know the Self as the rider in a chariot, and the body as simply the chariot. Know the intellect as the charioteer, and the mind as the reins. The senses, they say are the horses, and sense objects are the paths around them". The Katha Upanishad then declares that "when the Self [Ātman] understands this and is unified, integrated with body, senses and mind, is virtuous, mindful and pure, he reaches bliss, freedom and liberation".

=== Bhagavad Gita ===
In Bhagavad Gita verses 10-30 of the second chapter, Krishna urges Arjuna to understand the indestructible nature of the atman, emphasizing that it transcends the finite body it inhabits. The atman neither kills nor can be killed, as it is eternal and unaffected by birth or death. The analogy of changing clothes is used to illustrate how the soul discards old bodies for new ones. Krishna emphasizes the eternal existence of the soul by explaining that even as it undergoes various life stages and changes bodies it remains unaffected. It is imperceptible, inconceivable, and unchanging. The Bhagavata Purana also affirms that the atman was not born and will not die.

== Indian philosophy ==
=== Orthodox schools ===
Atman is a metaphysical and spiritual concept for Hindus, often discussed in their scriptures with the concept of Brahman. All major orthodox schools of Hinduism – Samkhya, Yoga, Nyaya, Vaisesika, Mimamsa, and Vedanta – accept the foundational premise of the Vedas and Upanishads that "Ātman exists." In Hindu philosophy, especially in the Vedanta school of Hinduism, Ātman is the first principle. Jainism too accepts this premise, although it has its own idea of what that means. In contrast, both Buddhism and the Charvakas deny that there is anything called "Ātman/soul/self".

==== Samkhya ====
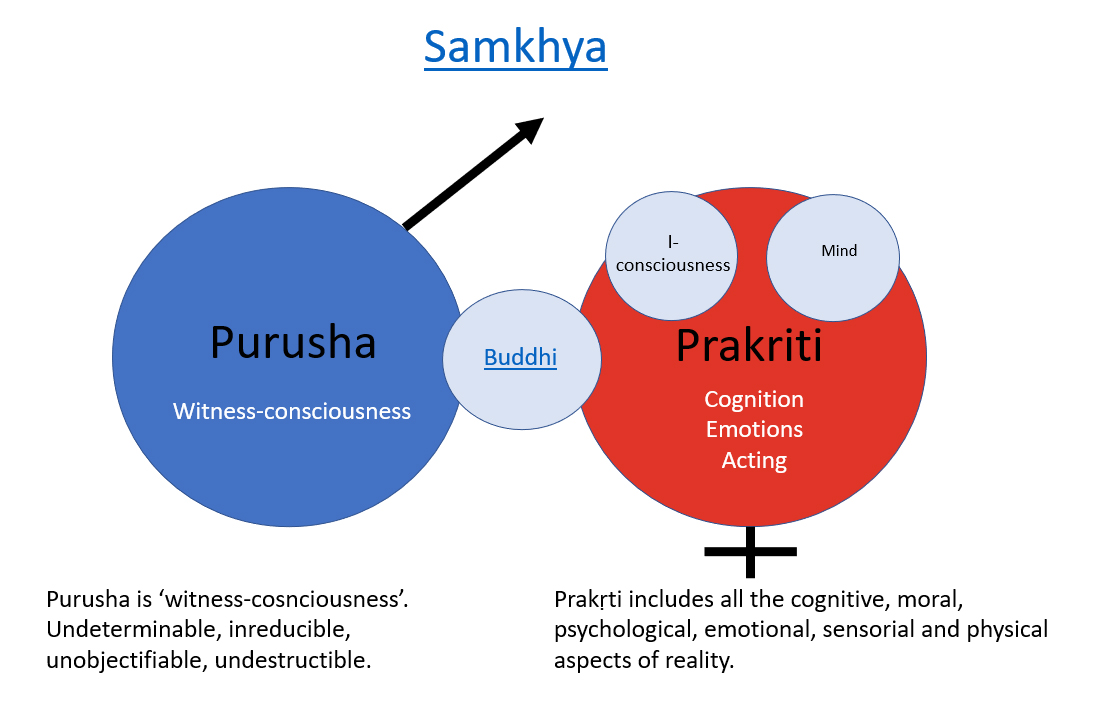
Purusha-prakriti

In Samkhya, the oldest Hindu school of Dualism, Puruṣa, the witness-consciousness, is Atman. It is absolute, independent, free, imperceptible, unknowable through other agencies, above any experience by mind or senses and beyond any words or explanations. It remains pure, "nonattributive consciousness". Puruṣa is neither produced nor does it produce. No appellations can qualify purusha, nor can it substantialized or objectified. It "cannot be reduced, can't be 'settled'." Any designation of purusha comes from prakriti, and is a limitation. Unlike Advaita Vedanta, and like Purva-Mīmāṃsā, Samkhya believes in plurality of the puruṣas.

Samkhya considers ego (asmita, ahamkara) to be the cause of pleasure and pain. Self-knowledge is the means to attain kaivalya, the separation of Atman from the body-mind complex.

==== Yoga philosophy ====
The Yogasutra of Patanjali, the foundational text of Yoga school of Hinduism, sees purusha as the essence of human beings, revealed in samadhi, but mentions Atma in multiple verses, and particularly in its last book, where Samadhi is described as the path to self-knowledge and kaivalya. Some earlier mentions of Atman in Yogasutra include verse 2.5, where evidence of ignorance includes "confusing what is not Atman as Atman".

अनित्याशुचिदुःखानात्मसु नित्यशुचिसुखात्मख्यातिरविद्या

Avidya (अविद्या, ignorance) is regarding the transient as eternal, the impure as pure, the pain-giving as joy-giving, and the non-Atman as Atman.

— Yogasutra 2.5

In verses 2.19-2.20, Yogasutra declares that pure ideas are the domain of Atman, the perceivable universe exists to enlighten Atman, but while Atman is pure, it may be deceived by complexities of perception or mind. These verses also set the purpose of all experience as a means to self-knowledge.

द्रष्टा दृशिमात्रः शुद्धोऽपि प्रत्ययानुपश्यः
तदर्थ एव दृश्यस्यात्मा

The seer is the absolute knower. Though pure, modifications are witnessed by him by coloring of intellect.
The spectacle exists only to serve the purpose of the Atman.

— Yogasutra 2.19 - 2.20

In Book 4, Yogasutra states spiritual liberation as the stage where the yogin achieves distinguishing self-knowledge, he no longer confuses his mind as Atman, the mind is no longer affected by afflictions or worries of any kind, ignorance vanishes, and "pure consciousness settles in its own pure nature".

The Yoga school is similar to the Samkhya school in its conceptual foundations of purusha as Ātman. It is the self that is discovered and realized in the Kaivalya state, in both schools. Like Samkhya, this is not a single universal Ātman. It is one of the many individual selves where each "pure consciousness settles in its own pure nature", as a unique distinct soul/self. However, Yoga school's methodology was widely influential on other schools of Hindu philosophy. Vedanta monism, for example, adopted Yoga as a means to reach Jivanmukti – self-realization in this life – as conceptualized in Advaita Vedanta. Yoga and Samkhya define Ātman as an "unrelated, attributeless, self-luminous, omnipresent entity", which is identical with consciousness.

==== Nyaya ====
According to John Plott, "Nyaya made considerable contributions to the logical explanation of the mode in which Ātman, although itself of the nature of the knower, can still be an object of knowledge." Plott states that the Nyaya scholars developed a theory of negation that far exceeds Hegel's theory of negation, while their epistemological theories refined to "know the knower" at least equals Aristotle's sophistication. Nyaya methodology influenced all major schools of Hinduism.

Nyaya scholars defined Ātman as an imperceptible substance that is the substrate of human consciousness, manifesting itself with or without qualities such as desires, feelings, perception, knowledge, understanding, errors, insights, sufferings, bliss, and others.

Nyaya theory of the ātman had two broader contributions to Hindu conceptions of the ātman. One, Nyaya scholars went beyond holding it as "self evident" and offered rational proofs, consistent with their epistemology, in their debates with Buddhists, that "Atman exists". Second, they developed theories on what "Atman is and is not". As proofs for the proposition 'self exists', for example, Nyaya scholars argued that personal recollections and memories of the form "I did this so many years ago" implicitly presume that there is a self that is substantial, continuing, unchanged, and existent. Pandit Badrinath Shukla argues that considerations of ontological economy show that the manas or "mind" alone suffices, thus contending that an eternal atman is unnecessary for the system, suggesting a rational revision to the Nyaya tradition.

Nyayasutra, a 2nd-century CE foundational text of Nyaya school of Hinduism, states that Atma is a proper object of human knowledge. It also states that Atman is a real substance that can be inferred from certain signs, objectively perceivable attributes. For example, in book 1, chapter 1, verses 9 and 10, Nyayasutra states

Ātman, body, senses, objects of senses, intellect, mind, activity, error, pretyabhava (after life), fruit, suffering and bliss are the objects of right knowledge.
Desire, aversion, effort, happiness, suffering and cognition are the Linga (लिङ्ग, mark, sign) of the Ātman.

— Nyaya Sutra, I.1.9-10

Book 2, chapter 1, verses 1 to 23, of the Nyayasutras posits that the sensory act of looking is different from perception and cognition–that perception and knowledge arise from the seekings and actions of Ātman. The Naiyayikas emphasize that Ātman has qualities, but is different from its qualities. For example, desire is one of many qualities of Ātman, but Ātman does not always have desire, and in the state of liberation, for instance, the Ātman is without desire. Additionally, the self has the property of consciousness, but that too, is not an essential property. Naiyayikas take the ātman to lose consciousness during deep sleep.

==== Vaiśeṣika ====
The Vaisheshika school of Hinduism, using its non-theistic theories of atomistic naturalism, posits that Ātman is one of the four eternal non-physical substances without attributes, the other three being kāla (time), dik (space) and manas (mind). Time and space, stated Vaiśeṣika scholars, are eka (one), nitya (eternal) and vibhu (all pervading). Time and space are indivisible reality, but human mind prefers to divide them to comprehend past, present, future, relative place of other substances and beings, direction and its own coordinates in the universe. In contrast to these characteristics of time and space, Vaiśeṣika scholars considered Ātman to be many, eternal, independent and spiritual substances that cannot be reduced or inferred from other three non-physical and five physical dravya (substances). Mind and sensory organs are instruments, while consciousness is the domain of "atman, soul, self".

The knowledge of Ātman, to Vaiśeṣika Hindus, is another knowledge without any "bliss" or "consciousness" moksha state that Vedanta and Yoga school describe.

==== Mimamsa ====
Ātman, in the ritualism-based Mīmāṃsā school of Hinduism, is an eternal, omnipresent, inherently active essence that is identified as I-consciousness. Unlike all other schools of Hinduism, Mimamsaka scholars considered ego and Atman as the same. Within Mimamsa school, there was divergence of beliefs. Kumārila, for example, believed that Atman is the object of I-consciousness, whereas Prabhākara believed that Atman is the subject of I-consciousness. Mimamsaka Hindus believed that what matters is virtuous actions and rituals completed with perfection, and it is this that creates merit and imprints knowledge on Atman, whether one is aware or not aware of Atman. Their foremost emphasis was formulation and understanding of laws/duties/virtuous life (dharma) and consequent perfect execution of kriyas (actions). The Upanishadic discussion of Atman, to them, was of secondary importance. While other schools disagreed and discarded the Atma theory of Mimamsa, they incorporated Mimamsa theories on ethics, self-discipline, action, and dharma as necessary in one's journey toward knowing one's Atman.

==== Vedanta ====
===== Advaita Vedanta =====
Advaita Vedanta (non-dualism) sees the Ātman (“spirit, soul, self”) as seemingly manifesting as many individuals, while being fully identical with Brahman. The Advaita school believes that there is one soul that connects and exists in all living beings, regardless of their shapes or forms, and there is no distinction. There is no separate devotee soul (Atman) and god soul (Brahman). Each self is non-different from the infinite.

Advaita Vedanta philosophy considers Atman as Sat-cit-ānanda, self-existent awareness, limitless and non-dual. Atman is the universal principle, one eternal undifferentiated self-luminous consciousness, the truth asserts Advaita Hinduism. Human beings, in a state of unawareness of this universal self, see their "I-ness" as different from the being in others, then act out of impulse, fears, cravings, malice, division, confusion, anxiety, passions, and a sense of distinctiveness. To Advaitins, Atman-knowledge is the state of full awareness, liberation, and freedom that overcomes dualities at all levels, realizing the divine within oneself, the divine in others, and in all living beings; the non-dual oneness, that God is in everything, and everything is God. This identification of individual living beings/souls, or jiva-atmas, with the 'one Atman' is the non-dualistic Advaita Vedanta position.

===== Dvaita Vedanta =====
Dvaita Vedanta differentiates the individual atman of living beings from the atman of a supreme being (Paramatman). God is the ultimate, perfect, but distinct soul from incomplete, imperfect jivas (individual souls). God created individual souls, state Dvaita Vedantins, but the individual soul never was and never will become one with God; the best it can do is to experience bliss by getting infinitely close to God. Liberation is only possible in after-life as communion with God, and only through the grace of God (if not, then one's Atman is reborn).

The Bhagavata Purana lists qualities of the self such as beginningless, without any material qualities, and self-existent without dependence on a body.

=== Heterodox schools ===
==== Buddhism ====
“Form (rūpaṁ) is emptiness, emptiness (śūnyatā) is form.”

— Prajñāpāramitā Hṛdayam

Applying the disidentification of 'no-self' to the logical end, Buddhism does not assert an unchanging essence, any "eternal, essential and absolute something called a soul, self or atman," According to Jayatilleke, the Upanishadic inquiry fails to find an empirical correlate of the assumed Atman, but nevertheless assumes its existence, and, states Mackenzie, Advaitins "reify consciousness as an eternal self." (Note: Prajñānaṁ Brahma (प्रज्ञानं ब्रह्म) - "Consciousness is Brahman" - Aitareya Upanishad 3.3 of the Rig Veda) In contrast, the Buddhist inquiry "is satisfied with the empirical investigation which shows that no such Atman exists because there is no evidence" states Jayatilleke.

While Nirvana is liberation from the kleshas and the disturbances of the mind-body complex, Buddhism eludes a definition of what it is that is liberated, implying, in Anguttara Nikaya 4.23, that the 'tathagata' is "deep, unfathomable." (Note: The word's original significance is not known and there has been speculation about it since at least the time of Buddhaghosa, who gives eight interpretations of the word, each with different etymological support, in his commentary on the Digha Nikaya, the Sumangalavilasini. According to Fyodor Shcherbatskoy, the term 'tathagata' has a non-Buddhist origin, and is best understood when compared to its usage in non-Buddhist works such as the Mahabharata.) According to Johannes Bronkhorst, "it is possible that original Buddhism did not deny the existence of soul," but did not want to talk about it, as they could not say that "the soul is essentially not involved in action, as their opponents did." While the skandhas are regarded is impermanent (anicca) and sorrowfull (dukkha), the existence of a permanent, joyful and unchanging self is neither acknowledged nor explicitly denied. Liberation is not attained by knowledge of such a self, but by " turning away from what might erroneously be regarded as the self."

According to Harvey, in Buddhism the negation of temporal existents is applied even more rigorously than in the Upanishads:

While the Upanishads recognized many things as being not-Self, they felt that a real, true Self could be found. They held that when it was found, and known to be identical to Brahman, the basis of everything, this would bring liberation. In the Buddhist Suttas, though, literally everything is seen is non-Self, even Nirvana. When this is known, then liberation – Nirvana – is attained by total non-attachment. Thus both the Upanishads and the Buddhist Suttas see many things as not-Self, but the Suttas apply it, indeed non-Self, to everything.

Nevertheless, Atman-like notions can also be found in Buddhist texts chronologically placed in the 1st millennium of the Common Era, such as the Mahayana tradition's Tathāgatagarbha sūtras suggest self-like concepts, variously called Tathagatagarbha or Buddha nature. In the Theravada tradition, the Dhammakaya Movement in Thailand teaches that it is erroneous to subsume nirvana under the rubric of anatta (non-self); instead, nirvana is taught to be the "true self" or dhammakaya. Similar interpretations have been put forth by the then Thai Sangharaja in 1939. According to Williams, the Sangharaja's interpretation echoes the tathāgatagarbha sutras.

The notion of Buddha-nature is controversial, and "eternal self" concepts have been vigorously attacked. These "self-like" concepts are neither self nor sentient being, nor soul, nor personality. Some scholars posit that the Tathagatagarbha Sutras were written to promote Buddhism to non-Buddhists. (Note: Williams (2008, pp. 104–105, 108–109): "(...) it refers to the Buddha using the term "Self" in order to win over non-Buddhist ascetics.") The Dhammakaya Movement teaching that nirvana is atta (atman) has been criticized as heretical in Buddhism by Prayudh Payutto, a well-known scholar monk, who added that 'Buddha taught nibbana as being non-self".

===== Pudgalavāda =====
Pudgalavāda was a Buddhist philosophical view and also referred to a group of Nikaya Buddhist schools (mainly known as Vātsīputrīyas) that arose within the school of minority elders who split from the majority Mahāsāṃghika after the Second Buddhist Council. The Pudgalavādins asserted that while there is no ātman, there exists a pudgala (person) or sattva (being), which is neither a conditioned dharma nor an unconditioned dharma.

Because the Vātsīputrīya views were seen as close to the concept of a self or ātman, they were sharply criticized by the Vibhajjavadins (a record of this is found in the Theravadin Kathavatthu), as well as by the Sarvastivadins (In the Vijñanakaya), Sautrantikas (most famously in the Abhidharmakosha), and the Madhyamaka school ( Candrakirti's Madhyamakavatara).

==== Jainism ====
Ātman is a philosophical term used within Jainism to identify the soul. As per Jain cosmology, jīva or soul is the principle of sentience and is one of the tattvas or one of the fundamental substances forming part of the universe. According to the Jain text, Samayasāra (2nd century CE or later):

Know that the Jiva (soul) which rests on pure faith, knowledge, and conduct, alone is the Real Self. The one which is conditioned by the karmic matter is to be known as the impure self. – Verse 1-2-2

According to Vijay Jain, the souls which rest on the pure self are called the Real Self, and only arihant and Siddhas are the Real Self.

==== Ājīvika ====
The predetermined fate (niyati) of living beings was the major distinctive doctrine of Ājīvika school, along with withholding judgement on how to achieve liberation (moksha) from the eternal cycle of birth, death, and rebirth, instead believing that fate would lead us there. Ājīvikas further considered the karma doctrine as a fallacy. They were mostly considered as atheists; however, they believed that in every living being there is an Ātman.

==== Sassatavāda ====
Sassatavāda refers to a school of "eternalism and categoralism" that holds the belief in an unchanging self. Whatever is known about Sassatavāda comes from Buddhist sources. According to the Pali Canon, Pakudha Kaccāyana founded this school around the 6th century BCE. He was an atomist who taught that everything is composed of seven eternal elements: earth, water, fire, air, happiness (joy), pain, and Ātman (soul). Pakudha further asserted that these elements do not interact with one another.

== Influence of Atman-concept on Hindu ethics ==
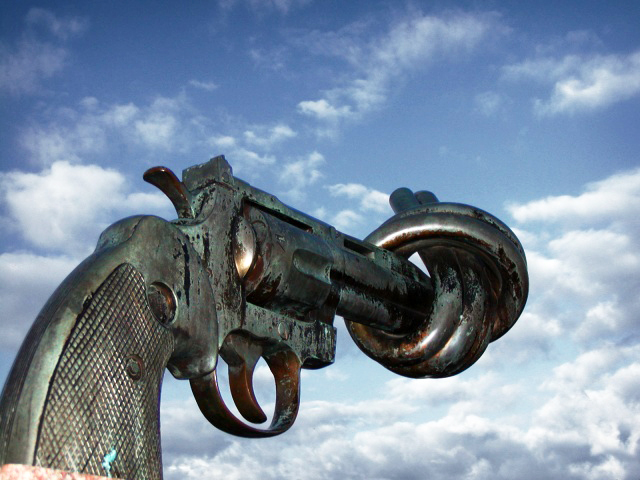
Ahimsa, non-violence, is considered the highest ethical value and virtue in Hinduism. The virtue of Ahimsa follows from the Atman theories of Hindu traditions.

The Atman theory in Upanishads had a profound impact on ancient ethical theories and dharma traditions now known as Hinduism. The earliest Dharmasutras of Hindus recite Atman theory from the Vedic texts and Upanishads, and on its foundation build precepts of dharma, laws and ethics. Atman theory, particularly the Advaita Vedanta and Yoga versions, influenced the emergence of the theory of Ahimsa (non-violence against all creatures), culture of vegetarianism, and other theories of ethical, dharmic life.

=== Dharma-sutras ===
The Dharmasutras and Dharmasastras integrate the teachings of Atman theory. Apastamba Dharmasutra, the oldest known Indian text on dharma, for example, titles Chapters 1.8.22 and 1.8.23 as "Knowledge of the Atman" and then recites,

There is no higher object than the attainment of the knowledge of Atman. We shall quote the verses from the Veda which refer to the attainment of the knowledge of the Atman. All living creatures are the dwelling of him who lies enveloped in matter, who is immortal, who is spotless. A wise man shall strive after the knowledge of the Atman. It is he [Self] who is the eternal part in all creatures, whose essence is wisdom, who is immortal, unchangeable, pure; he is the universe, he is the highest goal. – 1.8.22.2-7

Freedom from anger, from excitement, from rage, from greed, from perplexity, from hypocrisy, from hurtfulness (from injury to others); Speaking the truth, moderate eating, refraining from calumny and envy, sharing with others, avoiding accepting gifts, uprightness, forgiveness, gentleness, tranquility, temperance, amity with all living creatures, yoga, honorable conduct, benevolence and contentedness – These virtues have been agreed upon for all the ashramas; he who, according to the precepts of the sacred law, practices these, becomes united with the Universal Self. – 1.8.23.6

— Knowledge of the Atman, Apastamba Dharma Sūtra, ~ 400 BCE

=== Ahimsa ===
The ethical prohibition against harming any human beings or other living creatures (Ahimsa, अहिंसा), in Hindu traditions, can be traced to the Atman theory. This precept against injuring any living being appears together with Atman theory in hymn 8.15.1 of Chandogya Upanishad (ca. 8th century BCE), then becomes central in the texts of Hindu philosophy, entering the dharma codes of ancient Dharmasutras and later era Manu-Smriti. Ahimsa theory is a natural corollary and consequence of "Atman is universal oneness, present in all living beings. Atman connects and prevades in everyone. Hurting or injuring another being is hurting the Atman, and thus one's self that exists in another body". This conceptual connection between one's Atman, the universal, and Ahimsa starts in Isha Upanishad, develops in the theories of the ancient scholar Yajnavalkya, and one which inspired Gandhi as he led non-violent movement against colonialism in early 20th century.

यस्तु सर्वाणि भूतान्यात्मन्येवानुपश्यति । सर्वभूतेषु चात्मानं ततो न विजुगुप्सते ॥६॥
यस्मिन्सर्वाणि भूतान्यात्मैवाभूद्विजानतः । तत्र को मोहः कः शोक एकत्वमनुपश्यतः ॥७॥
स पर्यगाच्छुक्रमकायमव्रणम् अस्नाविरँ शुद्धमपापविद्धम् । कविर्मनीषी परिभूः स्वयम्भूःयाथातथ्यतोऽर्थान् व्यदधाच्छाश्वतीभ्यः समाभ्यः ॥८॥

And he who sees everything in his atman, and his atman in everything, does not seek to hide himself from that.
In whom all beings have become one with his own atman, what perplexity, what sorrow, is there when he sees this oneness?
He [the self] prevades all, resplendent, bodiless, woundless, without muscles, pure, untouched by evil; far-seeing, transcendent, self-being, disposing ends through perpetual ages.

— Isha Upanishad, Hymns 6-8,

== See also ==
- Ātman (Buddhism)
- Ātman (Jainism)
- Ishvara
- Jiva (Hinduism)
- Jnana
- Moksha
- Ousia
- Spirit
- Tat tvam asi
- Tree of Jiva and Atman

== Sources ==
Printed sources

- Baroni, Helen J. (2002), The Illustrated Encyclopedia of Zen Buddhism, Rosen Publishing, ISBN 978-0823922406
- Bronkhorst, Johannes (1993), The Two Traditions of Meditation in Ancient India, Motilal Banarsidass, ISBN 978-81-208-1114-0
- Bronkhorst, Johannes (2009), Buddhist Teaching in India, Wisdom Publications, ISBN 978-0-86171-811-5
- Chapple, Christopher Key (2008), Yoga and the Luminous: Patañjali's Spiritual Path to, SUNY Press
- Collins, Steven (1990), Selfless Persons: Imagery and Thought in Theravada Buddhism, Cambridge University Press, p. 82, ISBN 978-0-521-39726-1
- Collins, Steven (1994), Reynolds, Frank; Tracy, David (eds.), Religion and Practical Reason, State University of New York Press, ISBN 978-0791422175
- Dalal, R. (2011), The Religions of India: A Concise Guide to Nine Major Faiths, Penguin, ISBN 978-0143415176
- Deutsch, Eliot (1973), Advaita Vedanta: A Philosophical Reconstruction, University of Hawaii Press
- Eggeling, Hans Julius (1911). "Hinduism" . In Chisholm, Hugh (ed.). Encyclopædia Britannica. Vol. 13 (11th ed.). Cambridge University Press. pp. 501–513.
- Fowler, Merv (1999), Buddhism: Beliefs and Practices, Sussex Academic Press, ISBN 978-1-898723-66-0
- J. Ganeri (2013), The Concealed Art of the Soul, Oxford University Press, ISBN 978-0199658596
- Grimes, John (1996). A Concise Dictionary of Indian Philosophy: Sanskrit Terms Defined in English. State University of New York Press. ISBN 0791430685.
- Harvey, Peter (2012), An Introduction to Buddhism: Teachings, History and Practices, Cambridge University Press, ISBN 978-0-521-85942-4
- Hookham, S. K. (1991), The Buddha Within: Tathagatagarbha Doctrine According to the Shentong Interpretation of the Ratnagotravibhaga, State University of New York Press, ISBN 978-0-7914-0357-0
- Hubbard, Jamie; Swanson, Paul L., eds. (1997), Pruning the Bodhi Tree: The Storm over Critical Buddhism, University of Hawaii Press
- Jain, Vijay K. (2012), Acharya Kundkund's Samayasara, Vikalp Printers, ISBN 978-81-903639-3-8, "Non-Copyright"
- Javanaud, Katie (2013), "Is The Buddhist 'No-Self' Doctrine Compatible With Pursuing Nirvana?", Philosophy Now
- Jayatilleke, K.N. (1963), Early Buddhist Theory of Knowledge (PDF) (1st ed.), London: George Allen & Unwin Ltd., archived from the original (PDF) on September 11, 2015
- King, Richard (1995), Early Advaita Vedanta and Buddhism, State University of New York Press, ISBN 978-0791425138
- Koller, John (2012), "Shankara", in Meister, Chad; Copan, Paul (eds.), Routledge Companion to Philosophy of Religion, Routledge, ISBN 978-0415782944
- Lorenzen, David (2004), "Bhakti", in Mittal, Sushil; Thursby, Gene (eds.), The Hindu World, Routledge, ISBN 0-415215277
- Loy, David (1982), "Enlightenment in Buddhism and Advaita Vedanta: Are Nirvana and Moksha the Same?", International Philosophical Quarterly, 23 (1)
- Mackenzie, Matthew (2012), "Luminosity, Subjectivity, and Temporality: An Examination of Buddhist and Advaita views of Consciousness", in Kuznetsova, Irina; Ganeri, Jonardon; Ram-Prasad, Chakravarthi (eds.), Hindu and Buddhist Ideas in Dialogue: Self and No-Self, Routledge
- Mackenzie, Rory (2007), New Buddhist Movements in Thailand: Towards an Understanding of Wat Phra Dhammakaya and Santi Asoke, Routledge, ISBN 978-1-134-13262-1
- McClelland, Norman C. (2010), Encyclopedia of Reincarnation and Karma, McFarland, ISBN 978-0-7864-5675-8
- Meister, Chad (2010), The Oxford Handbook of Religious Diversity, Oxford University Press, ISBN 978-0195340136
- Olivelle, Patrick (2008), The Early Upanishads, Oxford University Press
- Osto, Douglas (January 2018), "No-Self in Sāṃkhya: A Comparative Look at Classical Sāṃkhya and Theravāda Buddhism", Philosophy East and West, 68 (1): 201–222, doi:10.1353/pew.2018.0010, S2CID 171859396
- Pettit, John W. (1999), Mipham's Beacon of Certainty: Illuminating the View of Dzogchen, the Great Perfection, Simon and Schuster, ISBN 978-0-86171-157-4
- Plott, John C. (2000), Global History of Philosophy: The Axial Age, Volume 1, Motilal Banarsidass, ISBN 978-8120801585
- Sharma, C. (1997), A Critical Survey of Indian Philosophy, New Delhi: Motilal Banarsidass Publ, ISBN 81-208-0365-5, archived from the original on 2005-11-01 – via Questia
- Shepard, Leslie (1991), Encyclopedia of Occultism & Parapsychology - Volume 1, Gale Research Incorporated, ISBN 9780810301962
- Suh, Dae-Sook (1994), Korean Studies: New Pacific Currents, University of Hawaii Press, ISBN 978-0824815981
- Williams, Paul (2008), Mahayana Buddhism: The Doctrinal Foundations (2 ed.), Routledge, ISBN 978-1-134-25056-1
- Wynne, Alexander (2011), "The ātman and its negation", Journal of the International Association of Buddhist Studies, 33 (1–2)

Web-sources
