= Tree of Jiva and Atman =

Part of Vedic scriptures

The Tree of Jiva and Atman appears in the Vedic scriptures concerning the soul.

The Rig Veda samhita 1.164.20-22, Mundaka Upanishad 3.1.1-2, Svetasvatara Upanishad 4.6-7, and Annapurna Upanishad 4.32 speak of two birds, one perched on the branch of the tree, which signifies the body, and eating its fruit, the other merely watching.

Rig Veda samhita says:

1.164.20 Two birds associated together, and mutual friends, take refuge in the same tree; one of them eats the sweet fig; the other abstaining from food, merely looks on.
1.164.21 Where the smooth-gliding rays, cognizant, distil the perpetual portion of water; there has the Lord and steadfast protector all beings accepted me, though immature in wisdom.
1.164.22 In the tree into which the smooth-gliding rays feeders on the sweet, enters, and again bring forth light over all, they have called the fruit sweet, but he partakes not of it who knows not the protector of the universe.

The first bird represents a Jiva, or individual self, or soul. Shiva Samhita briefly presents the nature and function of Jiva. It says:

Jiva lives in the man’s body and in the woman’s body as well. It is covered in all kinds of desires. There is a strong and tight relationship between him and the body throughout karma that was accumulated in the past lives. Every being enjoys and suffers according to his/her own past actions. The Jiva who’s done many good and virtuous deeds will enjoy a happy life and wonderful conditions in this world. But the Jiva, who, on the contrary, has done many bad deeds, will never find his peace. No matter what is the nature of his desire, positive or negative, it will always cling to the Jiva and follow him all the time, during his countless reincarnations.

When the Jiva becomes distracted by the fruits (signifying sensual pleasure), Jiva momentarily forgets the Lord and lover and tries to enjoy the fruit independently. This separating forgetfulness is maha-maya, or enthrallment, spiritual death, and constitutes the fall of the jiva into the world of material birth, death, disease and old age.

The second bird is the Paramatman, an aspect of God who accompanies every living being in the heart while she remains in the material world. He is the support of all beings and is beyond sensual pleasure.

== Parallels in Mandaeism ==
In Chapter 3, Hymn 54 of the Left Ginza, a Mandaean text, similar imagery is used.

O ye birds of the carob trees,

who are sitting upon their candles.

What are you eating, birds, from the carob trees;

what are you drinking from the candles?

When the time comes

when you are to depart from your body

what will your provisions be,

and what will be your nourishment for the journey?
