= Florent Parfait Mana =

Malagasy politician

Florent Parfait Mana is a Malagasy geographer and politician. A member of the National Assembly of Madagascar, he was elected as a member of the Tiako I Madagasikara party in the 2007 Malagasy parliamentary elections. He represents the first constituency of Toliary.
