= Manna Singh =

Indian field hockey player (1914–1954)

Major Manna Singh
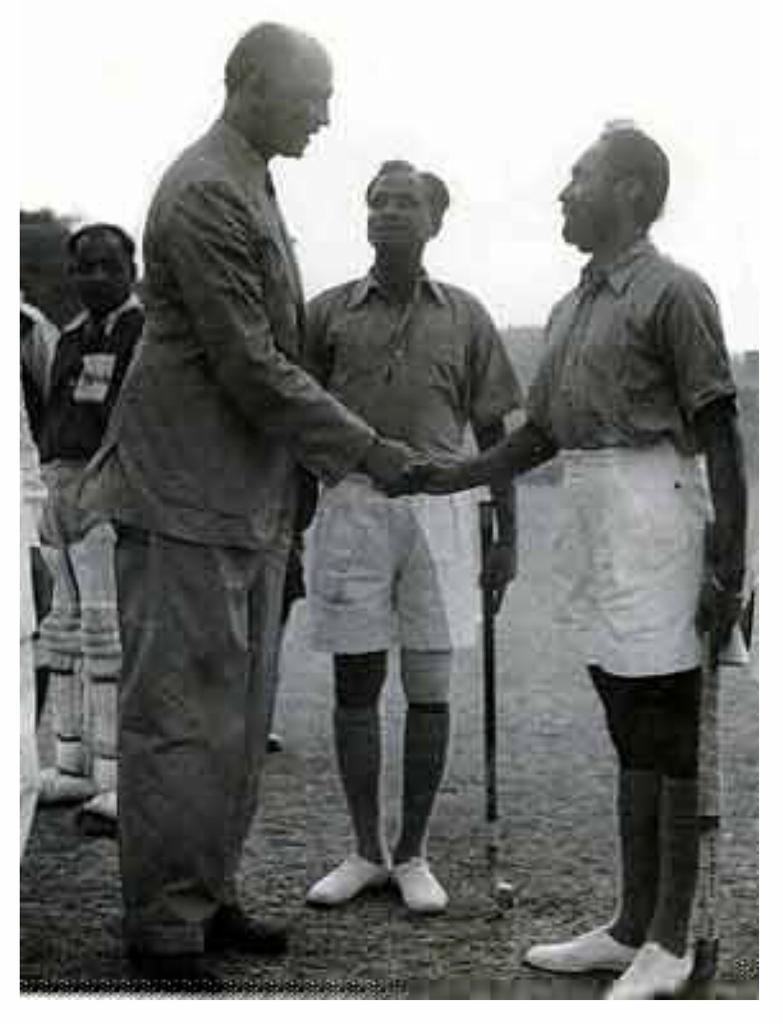
- Major Manna Singh shaking hands with K. M. Cariappa along with Major Dhyan Chand (1950)
- Born: 20 February 1914; Naushera (now in Khushab district), Punjab, British India
- Died: 22 July 1954 (aged 40); Poonch, J&K, India
- Military career
- Allegiance: India; India
- Branch: British Indian Army; Indian Army
- Service years: 1930 – 1954
- Rank: Major
- Unit: Maratha Light Infantry

Major Manna Singh (20 February 1914 – 22 July 1954) was an Indian field hockey player and officer in the British Indian Army. He was member of the Indian Hockey Federation team that visited East Africa during 1947-1948 under the captaincy of Dhyan Chand. He was the coach of Indian field hockey team.

== History ==
Manna Singh was born in Naushera, Punjab, British India on 20 February 1914. Manna Singh father's name was Kalyan Singh. Manna got his BSc degree at Khalsa College, Amritsar. He joined the British India Army before India's independence in 1947.

Manna Singh had a fair chance of selection in the Indian hockey team for the 1940 Summer Olympics, but the Olympic Games were suspended indefinitely due to the World War II. The Games did not resume until the 1948 Summer Olympics.

After 1947 India's independence, Manna opted for the Indian army. He played top level field hockey along with major Dhyan Chand. 1950 Manna along with Dhyan Chand got services gold medal. Manna served Indian Army at Pune and Ahmedabad.

In 1951, he played for Indian hockey team and won Rangaswami Cup with his team.

In 1954 he was posted in J&K, India.

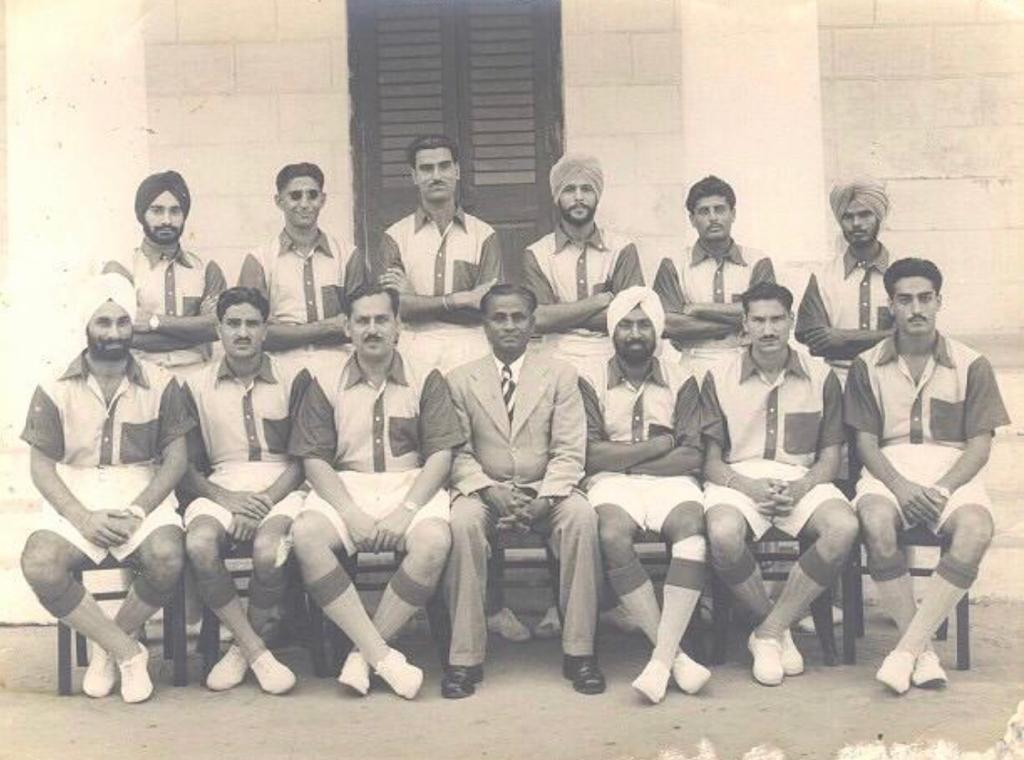
Major Manna Singh sitting fifth from left, in this group photo of an Indian Hockey Team in 1950

== Death ==
Manna Singh died on 22 July 1954 while patrolling Line of Control in Poonch, J&K, India. He was survived by wife Jagjit, son Daljit and daughters Harkirat and Kamaljit.
