= Mana (Ivanjica) =

- Village
- Location within Serbia
- Coordinates: 43°31′29″N 20°14′12″E
- Country: Serbia
- District: Moravica District
- Municipality: Ivanjica

Area
  - Total: 5.99 km^{2} (2.31 sq mi)

Population (2011)
  - Total: 202
  - Density: 33.7/km^{2} (87.3/sq mi)
- Time zone: UTC+1 (CET)
  - Summer (DST): UTC+2 (CEST)

Mana is a village in the municipality of Ivanjica, Serbia. According to the 2011 census, the village has a population of 202 inhabitants.
