= Mana (Mandaeism) =

Mandaean concept of nous or consciousness

The Mandaic word mana (ࡌࡀࡍࡀ) is a term that is roughly equivalent to the philosophical concept of nous. It has been variously translated as "mind", "soul", "treasure", "Garment", "Intellect", "Intelligence", "Heart", "Spirit", "Being"; or alternatively as "nous", "consciousness", or "vessel".

Theodor Nöldeke argued that the word is of Iranian origin.

== Meaning ==
E. S. Drower (1960) translates the literal Aramaic meaning of mana as 'a garment, robe, vehicle, vessel, instrument'. Symbolically, it refers to the 'soul' or 'mind'. Drower compares mana to the Valentinian concept of Sophia (Wisdom) and the Marcosian concept of Ennoia (Idea, Thought).

== In Mandaean scriptures ==
All of the hymns in Book 2 of the Left Ginza, in which the mana laments that it has been cast into the physical world, begin with the following refrain:

I am a mana of the Great Life (mana ana ḏ-hiia rbia)
I am a mana of the Mighty Life (mana ana ḏ-hiia rurbia)
I am a mana of the Great Life (mana ana ḏ-hiia rbia)

"I am a mana of the Great Life" (mana ana ḏ-hiia rbia) is also frequently used in the Mandaean Book of John. In Psalm 5 of the Manichaean Psalms of Thomas, the phrase "treasure of life" is derived from the aforementioned Mandaean formula according to Torgny Säve-Söderbergh. This phrase has also been borrowed by the Valentinian Gnostics from Mandaeism.

The Book 3 of the Right Ginza informs that the "mana within the mana" and the "fruit (pira) within the fruit" existed before even the spiritual universe (the World of Light) with its uthras and emanations came into being.

In Book 5, Chapter 1 of the Right Ginza (also known as the "Book of the Underworld"), Hag and Mag, two inhabitants of the World of Darkness, are described as the two manas of darkness.

On the origin of mana (reason or mind) in mankind, Book 10 of the Right Ginza states:

Thus when Ptahil went to his father Abatur, he took (away) a hidden Mana (mana kasia), which had been given to them from the house of the Life. And he brought it (back) and cast it into Adam and his wife Hawa.

In his 1816 Latin translation of the Ginza Rabba, Matthias Norberg translates the Mandaic word mana as aeon in Latin.

== As names of Hayyi Rabbi ==
According to E. S. Drower, the name Great Mind or Great Mana refers to the "over-soul" or "over-mind", the earliest manifestation of Hayyi ("Life"), from which the soul of a human might be seen as a spark or temporarily detached part. In book three of the Right Ginza, Hayyi is said to have "formed Himself in the likeness of the Great Mana, from which He emerged".

== As part of uthra names ==
As Mana Rba Kabira, he is paired with the name Kanat, a female uthra.

== See also ==
- Nous
- Neoplatonism § Nous
- Anima mundi
- Universal mind
- Panpsychism
- Noosphere
- Simat Hayyi
- Barbelo
- Nishimta, the soul in Mandaeism
- 'Aql in Islamic and Druze theology
