= Mana (newspaper) =

New Zealand Polynesian-language newspaper

- Front page of English edition, 4 May 1978
- Founded: 14 July 1977
- Ceased publication: 18 May 1978
- Language: Māori, Samoan, Tongan, Fijian, Rotuman, Niuean, Cook Islands Maori
- City: Auckland
- Country: New Zealand
- Free online archives: https://paperspast.natlib.govt.nz/newspapers/mana-auckland

Mana was the first multi-lingual Polynesian newspaper published in Auckland, New Zealand. The newspaper ran from 1977–78 and represented the voices and issues of Māori and Pacific communities in New Zealand during a period of social upheaval.

== History ==
In 1839, a Samoan language newspaper was established by the London Missionary Society in Falelatai, Samoa. The first te reo Māori newspaper in New Zealand was published in 1842, but the first Māori controlled newspaper was published 20 years later. Te Hokio e rere atu na was a te reo Māori newspaper published by the Kingitanga in 1861. This is considered the first major indigenous newspaper in New Zealand. However the suppression of te reo Māori as a language in the 20th century meant Māori newspapers struggled to function.

Mana was established by the Mana Interim Committee in 1977, created by and for Māori and New Zealand Pacific communities in New Zealand to provide a counter-narrative to mainstream media. During the one year period where Mana was published, only two articles in mainstream media in New Zealand were focused on Māori and Pacific representations. The publication ran fortnightly and its first issue was a dummy-run in mid-June 1977, where they gave away 10,000 copies. The newspaper officially began on 14 July and was sold at 20 cents for the eight-page issue. Its launch was helped by the Student Christian Movement, who contributed $1000, as well as donations from the New Zealand Catholic Overseas Aid Committee. The five-thousand printed copies contained five Pacific languages alongside English translations.

The paper was printed via a Gestetner, a type of stencil duplicator. These were used before the adoption of photocopiers, using rotating stencils to transfer ink to paper. Typewriters were used to write the articles and these technologies influenced the design approach and layout of the content in the newspaper.

Mana had a small operating budget, keeping within $1000 per issue. The paper drew income from advertising, which accounted for around $300 and was decided early on to only take up 25% of the space on the newspaper. Subscriptions and casual sales made up the rest of the paper's income. Initially, there was only one paid full-time employee named John Minty. Minty had previously worked for the Auckland Star. As months passed, the magazine became entirely volunteer based.

The newspaper published its thirteenth and last issue on 18 May 1978. The last issue included an advertisement for new subscribers and gave no indication of its upcoming termination.

== Editors ==
The editorial board consisted of:

- Joris de Bres (Note: De Bres would later serve as New Zealand's Race Relations Commissioner.)
- Vapi Kupenga (Ngāti Porou), Māori editor
- Aiao Kaulima, Niuean editor
- Nalesoni Tupou, Tongan editor
- Wairaki Toevai, Samoan editor
- Nihi Vini, Cook Islands editor

Wairaki Toevai was a Samoan writer who moved to New Zealand in 1970. He initially worked for the Auckland Star before joining Mana as an editor. He had close ties to The Samoan Observer, so he would provide news from his home. Toevai also would allow young people to contribute to his section. One poem by a student at Mangere College was so popular he had to translate it to English in the next issue.

Other editors included Vaivo John Elcombe Antonio, who was the Fijian/Rotuman editor. He received the Order of Australia in 1988 for his service to Pacific peoples. Many editors were part of wider movements in this period, including popular editor Syd Jackson (Ngāti Porou, Ngati Kahungunu) and associate editor Tiglau Less, who was a founding member of the Polynesian Panthers.

== Content ==
Each issue discussed specific content for its communities, alongside an English translation. Mana was published in languages including te reo Māori, Samoan, Tongan, Niuean, Cook Islands Māori, and Fijian. The paper included letters to the editor, which often began with the te reo Māori phrase "e hoa mā" (dear friends). Photographers Gil Hanly and John Miller contributed many photos to Mana.

The newspaper came at a time of social change for Māori and Pacific communities in New Zealand, during what is sometimes called the Māori renaissance. The newspaper represented a concerted effort to champion Māori and Pacific lives and views. During Mana's one year stint as a paper, the Dawn raids (1974-80) were ongoing as well as the Takaparawhau Bastion Point occupation (1977–78). Mana was closely associated and aligned with the Polynesian Panthers. These topics were covered in detail in Mana and its journalism aided the Bastion Point protestors in spreading their message about the issues of indigenous land sovereignty. But the newspaper also had a focus on the mundane, such as wedding and birthday celebrations and discussions about sport, arts, and literature. This was important to the newspaper as Māori and Pacific people were often displayed in a protest or criminal context by mainstream media, restricting representations of these communities to one negative stereotype. It also presented Pacific countries as varied and diverse at a time when the New Zealand Government and its agencies referred to Pacific Islanders as a unanimous unit.

== Legacy ==
Though brief, the newspaper contributed to the preservation of Māori and Pacific languages.

An exhibition titled Mana: Protest in Print at Auckland War Memorial Museum opened in 2025 to celebrate Mana's short but impactful existence as a newspaper that championed civil rights and social justice. The exhibition includes original copies of newspapers and photographs as well as stories from the editors and journalists. The exhibition identifies language as a form of resistance.

Copies of each issue of Mana was held by Auckland War Memorial Museum and before staging their exhibition, they worked with the National Library of New Zealand to digitise the newspaper on Papers Past.
