= Temple of the Cross =

Temple of the Cross may refer to:

- Temple of the Cross Complex, a complex of temples at the Maya site of Palenque in the state of Chiapas in Mexico
- Cross Temple, Fangshan, a former place of worship in Fangshan, Beijing
