= Cross Temple, Fangshan =

Religious site in Fangshan District, Beijing

Cross Temple
- 十字寺 (Chinese)
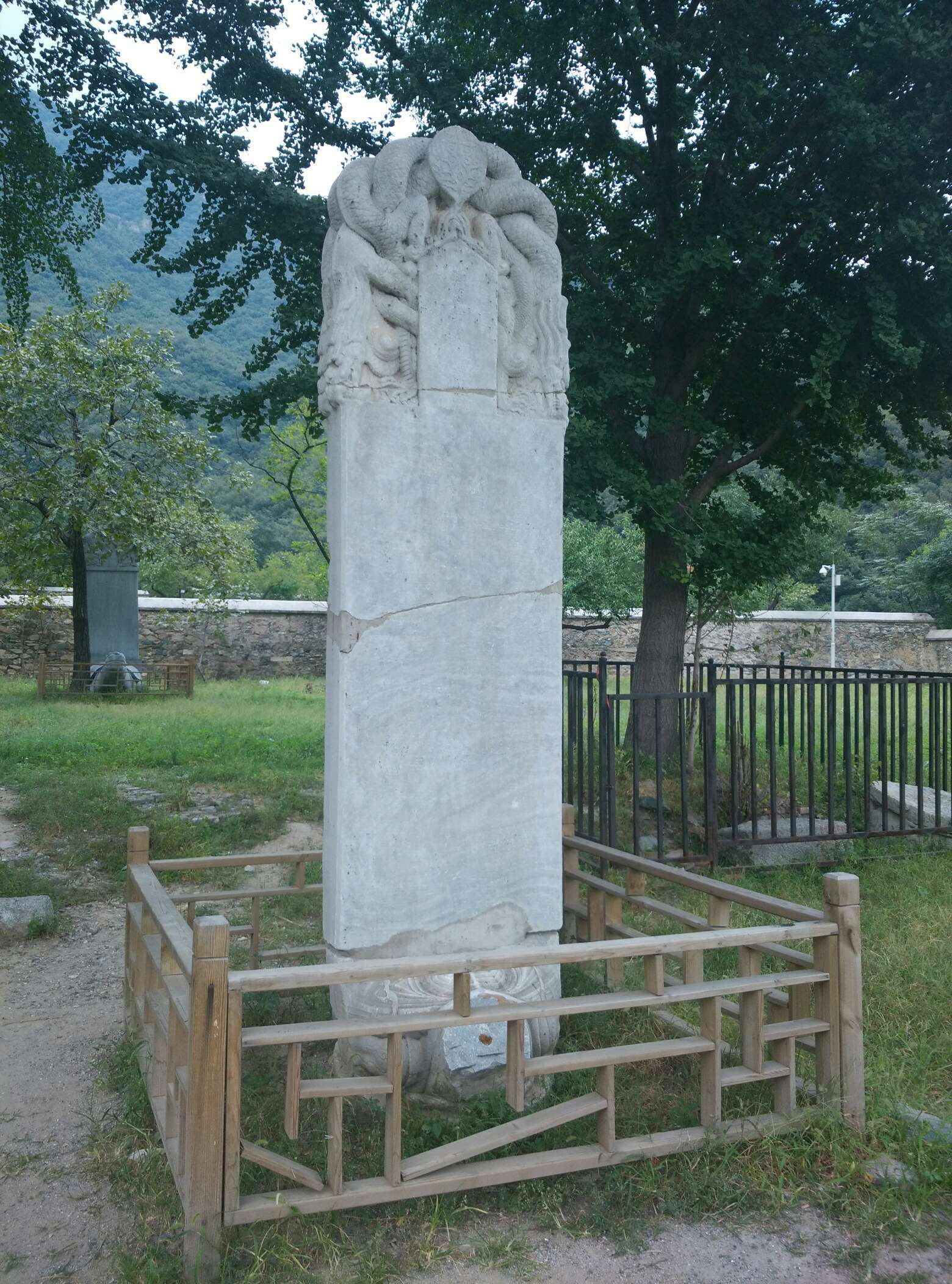
- A Yuan-era stele in the ruins of the Cross Temple. Another stele (left) and some scattered groundwork (right) are visible in the background.

- Location within Beijing Location within China
- 39°44′35″N 115°54′06″E
- Type: Abandoned Buddhist and Nestorian Christian religious site
- Location: North Sanpen Mountain, Chechang Village, Zhoukoudian, Fangshan District, Beijing

History
- Built: As a Buddhist temple, possibly 317
- Rebuilt: 639, c. 960, 1365, 1535

Cross Temple, Fangshan
- Chinese: 十字寺
Transcriptions
Standard Mandarin
- Hanyu Pinyin: Shízì sì
- IPA: [ʂɻ̩̌.tsɹ̩̂ sɹ̩̂]
Yue: Cantonese
- Yale Romanization: Sahpjih jih
- Jyutping: Sap6-zi6 zi6
- IPA: [sɐp̚˨.tsi˨ tsi˨]

The Cross Temple (Chinese: 十字寺; pinyin: Shízì sì) (Note: In English literature, the site is also known as the Temple of the Cross or the Monastery of the Cross.) is a former place of worship in Fangshan, Beijing. The temple was used during different periods by Buddhists and early Chinese Christians. Though it was originally built as a Buddhist temple, some scholars hypothesise that it saw Christian use during the Tang dynasty (618–907). The temple was used by Buddhists during the Liao dynasty (916–1125) and by Christians during the Yuan dynasty (1271–1368). It returned to Buddhist use during the Ming dynasty (1368–1644), before being sold in 1911. It was first recorded in modern scholarship in 1919, damaged during the Cultural Revolution, and re-established as a national-level protected site in 2006. Some scholars consider it to be the only place of worship of the Church of the East (also known as Nestorian Christianity) discovered in China. (Note: The use of the term "Nestorian" to refer to the Church of the East is controversial. Some scholars refuse to use the term, citing potential implication of a direct connection between the Church and the 5th-century theologian Nestorius, who was condemned for heresy at the Council of Ephesus—despite the theology of early Chinese Christianity not entirely corresponding to the views held by or ascribed to Nestorius. However, Aprem Mooken, a metropolitan bishop in the Assyrian Church of the East, has welcomed the term's use, stating that "the name Nestorian Church is not without honour in the missionary history of the Church [...] Especially in China, the name of the Nestorian Church is an honourable name." This article will use the terms "Nestorian" and the "Church of the East in China" interchangeably.)

Today, the site features two ancient steles, as well as groundwork and the bases of several pillars. The steles date to the Liao and Yuan dynasties, but their inscriptions were tampered with during the Ming. During the early 20th century, two stone blocks carved with crosses and other patterns were also discovered at the site, with one of them also bearing an inscription in Syriac. The blocks are presently on display at the Nanjing Museum.

== History ==
=== Early history: Buddhist use ===
According to a Liao dynasty (916–1125) stele at the temple site, a Buddhist monk named Huijing (惠靜) began building the temple in 317—the first year of the reign of Emperor Yuan, founder of the Eastern Jin dynasty (317–420). In 639, during the Tang dynasty (618–907), a monk named Yiduan (義端) re-furnished the temple. The scholar Wang Xiaojing proposed that the author of the Liao stele was mistaken, and the temple was actually built during the Later Jin dynasty (936–947). The monastery's name during the Jin and Tang periods is not known.

=== Context of early Chinese Christianity ===
After the Council of Ephesus in 431 condemned Nestorius, patriarch of Constantinople, his followers went into the Sasanian Empire and joined the Church of the East. The Church of the East later sent missionaries into Central Asia, Arabia, and India, and established metropolitan bishoprics along important cities along the Silk Road leading to China. In 635, the Christian monk Alopen reached Chang'an (modern Xi'an), the Tang capital. According to the scholar Nicolas Standaert, Nestorian Christian communities were "relatively numerous" during the Tang dynasty, particularly in cities with much foreign trade, but these communities were "probably not extremely important". In 845, Emperor Wuzong of Tang initiated the Huichang persecution of Buddhism. Although the emperor mainly intended to suppress Buddhism, he ordered monks of all foreign religions, including Nestorian Christianity, to return to laity. Around the same time, the Tang lost control over modern northwestern China and the routes between China and Central Asia were severed. Although Buddhism rebounded from the persecution, the Church of the East in China disappeared from China along with most other foreign religions.

One of the primary sources of Nestorian Christianity in the Tang dynasty is the Xi'an Stele. It was made around 781 with its text written by the Nestorian monk Adam. The text contains Christian doctrines, a history of the Church of the East in China since 635, various praises, and a list of members of the clergy in China. It was discovered near Xi'an in the 1620s.

Central Asian Nestorian Christians moved to northern China during the 12th and 13th centuries, although it is unlikely that they had any connection with the Tang dynasty Nestorian Christians. In the early 13th century, when the Mongols conquered northern China, some of these Nestorian Christians took administrative positions. In the same time period, the Church of the East also established new metropolitan provinces along the trade routes to China. The Mongol-ruled Yuan dynasty (1271–1368) put Nestorian churches and hierarchy under its governmental administration: the office of Chongfu Si (崇福司; 'Administration of Honoured Blessing') was established in 1289 to oversee Nestorian clergy and practices, and its inaugural administrator was a Nestorian Arab named Isa. Christianity in China declined again after the fall of the Yuan dynasty. The Nestorian missionaries in China probably departed together with the former Mongol rulers, converted foreigners and foreign traders, when they were expelled from China. The records of the following Ming dynasty (1368–1644) do not mention any descendants of Yuan Christians. According to the scholar Qiu Shusen, most Yuan-era Nestorians were Central Asians of the Semu caste, who later assimilated into the dominant Han culture during the Ming and no longer practised their western religions. This ultimately led to the disappearance of Nestorian Christianity in China.

=== Tang dynasty: possible Christian use ===
Some scholars suggested that the Cross Temple may have belonged to the Church of the East in China during the Tang dynasty (618–907). The Japanese scholar P. Y. Saeki speculated that believers fleeing from the Tang capital of Chang'an (modern Xi'an) to Youzhou and Liaodong (Note: Youzhou and Liaodong are both regions in the northeast of the Tang Empire. Youzhou is the state that contains modern-day Beijing.) during the 9th-century Huichang persecution began using the temple. Tang Xiaofeng pointed to inscriptions on the Liao stele as an indication that Christian crosses were present at the temple prior to the Liao dynasty. In addition, Tang claimed that another text written by Li Zhongxuan in 987 indicated a Nestorian presence in Youzhou. However, British sinologist Arthur Christopher Moule believed that there was insufficient evidence to show that the Church of the East in China reached Beijing before the 13th century.

=== Liao dynasty: Buddhist use ===
During the Liao dynasty (916–1125), the Cross Temple was called "Chongsheng Yuan" (崇聖院; 'Hall of the Honoured Saint'). Buddhists rebuilt it during the reign of Emperor Muzong of Liao, but the exact date of rebuilding is unclear. The Liao stele on site refers to the tenth year of Emperor Yuan's reign, which corresponds to 960. However, it also states "Bingzi" (丙子) as the year's sexagenary cycle—an ancient Chinese system of recording years. These two statements do not align, differing by a span of 16 years. The Liao stele does not indicate any relationship between the site and Christianity, and it is believed that Chongsheng Yuan was a Buddhist temple. The scholar Xu Pingfang held that Nestorian activities at the site commenced only after Buddhist activity had ended. Xu also believed that the errors in the stele text were not likely made by the original authors, but by Ming people who re-carved the steles.

=== Yuan dynasty: Christian use ===
Nestorian Christianity spread throughout the area after the Mongol capture of the Jurchen Jin capital of Zhongdu (near modern Beijing) in 1215. Under the Mongol-Yuan regime, Beijing had a metropolitan bishop. There are several theories on how the Cross Temple, located outside of Beijing, came into Christian use during the Yuan dynasty. Wang hypothesized that a Nestorian passed by Fangshan, discovered the abandoned temple, and turned it into a monastic retreat. Tang Xiaofeng and Zhang Yingying suggested it is also possible that the Cross Temple was rebuilt during this period.

Rabban Sauma (c. 1220 – 1294) was a Uyghur Nestorian Christian monk born in Beijing during the Yuan, who travelled from China to Baghdad. According to a contemporary record, the young Sauma became an ascetic for seven years on a mountain a day's journey outside of Beijing. Moule conjectured that the Cross Temple was probably near Sauma's hermitage. Shi Mingpei argued that the description of Rabban Sauma's hermitage is "extremely similar" to the Cross Temple and its surrounding terrain "according to records", and in 2011 Tang Li asserted that Rabban Sauma came from the site.

Wang estimated that Nestorian Christians had abandoned the site before 1358. This was the date when Buddhist monks began rebuilding the temple, a project which was completed in 1365. According to the Yuan stele, a Buddhist monk named Jingshan (淨善) initiated the reconstruction because he dreamed of a deity in his meditation, and then saw a shining cross on top of an ancient dhvaja at the temple site. The stele gives the names of the temple's major benefactors as the prince of Huai Temür Bukha, the eunuch-official Zhao Bayan Bukha (趙伯顏不花), and the minister Qingtong, with the inscription itself being made by Huang Jin. In 1992, Xu Pingfang suggested that Temür Bukha would have been familiar with Nestorian practices because his grandmother Sorghaghtani Beki was a Nestorian. He might have requested that the Buddhist temple continue to use the name "Cross Temple" when it was rebuilt, and that its Nestorian artefacts be preserved. However, modern scholars generally consider that the inscription on the Yuan stele is a forgery done during the Ming dynasty, and that the information regarding the Yuan benefactors is false.

Wang suggested that the official name of the temple during the Yuan period was "Chongsheng Yuan". She further argued that the Han Chinese population at the time used the term "cross temple" to refer to Nestorian churches in general, and that Nestorians at the time would not have called it "Cross Temple". However, because the name "Cross Temple" was simple and direct, local residents began to use it after the arrival of the Nestorians.

=== Ming and Qing dynasties: Buddhist use ===
Nestorian Christians continued to have a presence in northern China during the early Ming dynasty. Around 1437, (Note: According to Xu's transcription of the record in his 1992 paper, it was the third year of Zhengtong era (1438). However, Shi put the second year of Zhengtong (1437) in his 2000 paper.) some Nestorian monks visited the Yunju Temple, which is also in Fangshan, and left a record. The Jesuit missionary Matteo Ricci (fl. 1582–1610) was told by a Jewish informant that there was a Nestorian population in northern China during the early Ming. Ricci was told that the Chinese Nestorians were keeping their religious identity a secret, but they still referred to a former Nestorian church as the "Cross Church".

In 1535, the site was rebuilt by a Buddhist monk named Dejing (德景), supported by local villagers and the family of Gao Rong (高榮), a nephew of the powerful Ming eunuch official Gao Feng. During reconstruction, the inscriptions of the Liao and Yuan steles were altered—with the building officially known as the "Cross Temple" by this time.

During the Qing dynasty (1644–1912), in the History of Fangshan County (房山縣誌) compiled around 1664, the Cross Temple was briefly mentioned. It was listed along with other Buddhist temples in the county. In his Yifengtang Jinshi Wenzi Mu (藝風堂金石文字目; 'Index of Texts of Bronze and Stone Inscriptions by Yifengtang') written in 1897, Miao Quansun included the text of the Liao stele. Around 1911, the Buddhist monks sold the temple and the surrounding lands.

=== Modern rediscovery and development ===
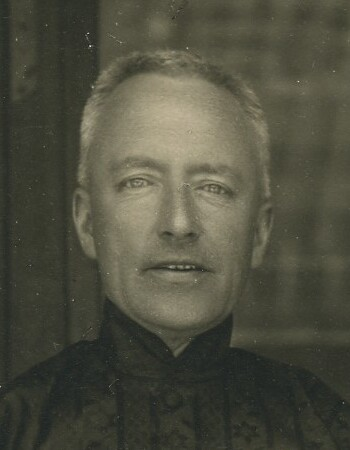
Reginald Johnston rediscovered the Cross Temple in the summer of 1919.

An early mention of the Cross Temple in Western academic context appeared in The New China Review in July 1919, where H. I. Harding noted the temple's existence near Beijing and that its name could have potential links with Christianity. In the same year, the Scottish diplomat Reginald Johnston discovered the site while seeking shelter from a thunderstorm. In October 1919, Johnston published an article about the site entitled "A Chinese Temple of the Cross", writing under the pseudonym "Christopher Irving".

The scholar P. Y. Saeki visited the site in 1931, and recorded that most of the site's buildings still existed at that time. Saeki noted that there was a Shanmen entry (a type of entry hall of Buddhist temples), followed by the Hall of Four Heavenly Kings. Beyond the hall, there was a courtyard with two ginkgo trees, and the Liao and Yuan steles were next to each tree. The courtyard had a kitchen and a dormitory for the monks to its right and another dormitory to its left. The Main Hall of the temple was at the end of the courtyard, and it contained three statues of the Buddha. A 21st-century study stated that the Shanmen building was 17.5 m (57 ft) south of the Main Hall, with dimensions 7.08 m × 11.24 m (23.2 ft × 36.9 ft).

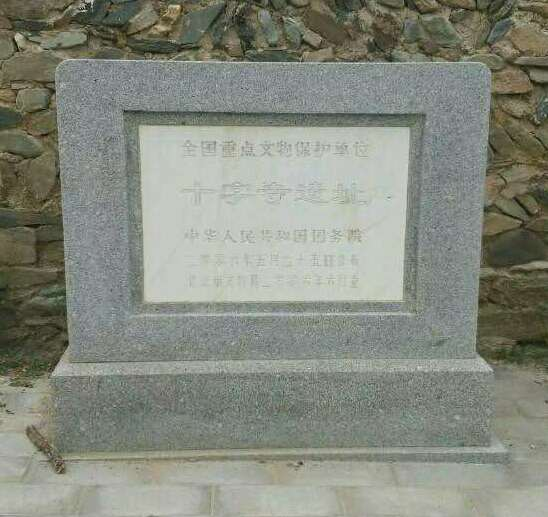
A marker near the ruins indicating their official status as a Major Historical and Cultural Site Protected at the National Level.

During the Cultural Revolution, the two steles were knocked down and broken into pieces. In the 1990s, the Beijing branches of the China Christian Council (CCC) and the Three-Self Patriotic Movement (TSPM) rebuilt the site's walls. In 2006, its ruins were designated as a Major Historical and Cultural Site Protected at the National Level.

== Current state ==
Some scholars consider the Cross Temple to be the only place of worship of the Church of the East discovered in China. (Note: In his 2001 book The Jesus Sutra, the scholar Martin Palmer claimed that the Tang-dynasty Daqin Pagoda near Xi'an is also a Nestorian Christian site. This view is partly based on P. Y. Saeki's analysis in the 20th century. However, other scholars, including Max Deeg and Michael Keevak, disagreed with Palmer's conclusion, citing modern scholarship. The scholar James H. Morris concluded in 2017 that more detailed archaeological analysis of the pagoda's site is needed, and that "there are no proven direct archaeological remains for the presence of Christianity during the Tang period.") It is located near Chechang Village (车厂村) in the Zhoukoudian Area, Fangshan District, to the southwest of Beijing City. Its grounds are 50 m (160 ft) across from east to west, and 45 m (148 ft) across from north to south. It is surrounded by walls on four sides, with entrances in the north and south. After severe rain in 2012 damaged the site and the walls, gutters and surveillance cameras were added.

No buildings remain standing at the site of the Cross Temple. There is some groundwork at the north and west parts of the site, where the Main Hall and the dormitory of the Buddhist monks once stood. The Main Hall site has dimensions 11.32 m (37.1 ft) from north to south, and 19.6 m (64 ft) from east to west. There are pillar bases scattered the ruins of the Main Hall, and remnants of stairs in front. In front of the Main Hall, there are two ginkgo trees: one ancient and one new. The newer tree was planted to replace another ancient one, which was destroyed by fire. There is a footpath between the trees. On the southern part of the path, there is a Yuan dynasty stele, and a Liao dynasty stele is to its east. To the south of the Yuan stele, there are some hardly noticeable marks of the Shanmen building. A replica of the Xi'an Stele was added to the site during the early 21st century, placed in front of the north wall.

== Relics ==
=== Stone steles ===
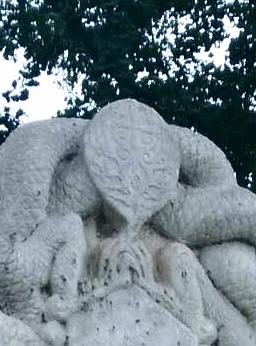
The top of the Yuan stele, featuring an engraving of a cross surrounded by dragons

There are two steles at the Cross Temple site: the Liao stele was raised in 960, and the Yuan stele was raised in 1365. Both were re-carved during the Ming dynasty in 1535. During the Cultural Revolution, the Liao stele was broken in the middle and part of its bottom left corner went missing, while the Yuan stele was broken into three pieces. During the early 21st century, both were repaired and re-raised. Both steles bear inscriptions, though they do not explicitly mention Christianity. The Yuan stele features a cross at its top, but according to the scholar Wang Xiaojing, it was probably not made by the Nestorians, as stele making was a Han Chinese practice, and there were very few Han Nestorians during the Yuan dynasty.

Scholars generally agree that while the two steles were from the Liao and Yuan dynasties respectively, their inscriptions were tampered with by Ming writers, and there are errors in their stated dates and names of individuals. According to Wang Xiaojing, in order to elevate the temple's status and garner more support and donations from Buddhists, the Ming writers changed the inscriptions of the two steles to claim that the temple received royal charters, that it had received donations from famous figures, and that it had been larger in size during the Yuan period. Tang Xiaofeng and Zhang Yingying suggest that the altered inscriptions were based on rumours.

=== Stone plaque ===
A stone plaque inscribed with the characters 「古剎十字禪林」 ('Ancient Cross Buddhist Temple') had previously been installed atop the temple's gate. Records from 1919 indicated the plaque was still present, but in 1931 Saeki noted that it had fallen off and broken. When Wu Mengling (吴梦麟) visited the site in October 1992, he found one of the broken pieces in front of the ginkgo trees. According to Wang, the plaque is currently stored by the Fangshan District Bureau of Cultural Artifacts, though Tang and Zhang claimed it is on display at the Beijing Stone Carving Art Museum.

=== Carved stone blocks ===
There were previously two blocks of carved stone at the Cross Temple site. The two stone blocks are rectangular, with a vertical hollow in the rear. They are 68.5 cm (27.0 in) tall and 58.5 cm (23.0 in) wide. For each, the front face and sides are 22 cm (8.7 in) and 14 cm (5.5 in) thick, respectively. Each have crosses carved into their front face, and flowers carved into each of their two sides. The scholar Niu Ruiji claimed that the two stone blocks were originally connected, with the two crosses at the opposite ends.

Reginald Johnston first discovered the stone blocks and recorded them in his 1919 article. Johnston recorded claims by the monks that the blocks had been discovered underground in 1357, during repairs to the temple's Hall of Heavenly Kings. In 1921, Francis Crawford Burkitt published his identification and translation of the inscriptions on one of the stone blocks.

Fearing that foreigners might remove the stone blocks from the site, Zhuang Shangyan and Wang Zuobin of the Peiping Commission for the Preservation of Antiquities (北平古物保管委員會) (Note: "Peiping" is one of the former names of Beijing.) surveyed the site in September 1931. The following month, the blocks were transported to the Peiping Museum of History (北平歷史博物館) for exhibition. During the Second Sino-Japanese War, they were transferred to Nanjing, and are currently on display in the Nanjing Museum. A replica of one of the blocks is in the collection of the National Museum of China, and two replicas are at the nearby Yunju Temple.

According to Tang Li, Christians following East Syrian traditions in the Far East often practised adoration of the cross and images. While both feature crosses and flowers in vases, details of the carvings differ between the two blocks. The sides of one block feature chrysanthemums in a vase; the cross on its front is supported by clouds and lotuses, and features a Baoxianghua pattern at its centre. Additionally, the cross is framed by an inscription in Syriac, which reads:

ܚܘܪܘ ܠܘܬܗ ܘ ܣܒܪܘ ܒܗ (Note: Romanization: ḥwrw lwth wsbrw bh. Pronunciation: ḥur lwātēh w-sabbar bēh.)

Look towards him and trust in him.

— Psalms 34:5–6 (Peshitta version)

According to P. G. Borbone, the text is often associated with the triumphal cross. The text-cross combination is also found on a funerary inscription near Chifeng in Inner Mongolia, but the text is placed above the arms of the Chifeng cross. According to Moule, F. C. Burkitt found the same Syriac text surrounding the Christian cross, but with the addition of the phrase "the living cross", in one of the Add. 14459 Syriac gospel manuscripts, as the frontispiece of the Gospel of Luke.

On the other stone block, the cross also has a Baoxianghua pattern, but there are two heart-like shapes extensions at the left and right ends of the cross. It is also mounted on two layers of lotuses, one facing up and one facing down. On the side, it depicts peonies in a basin.

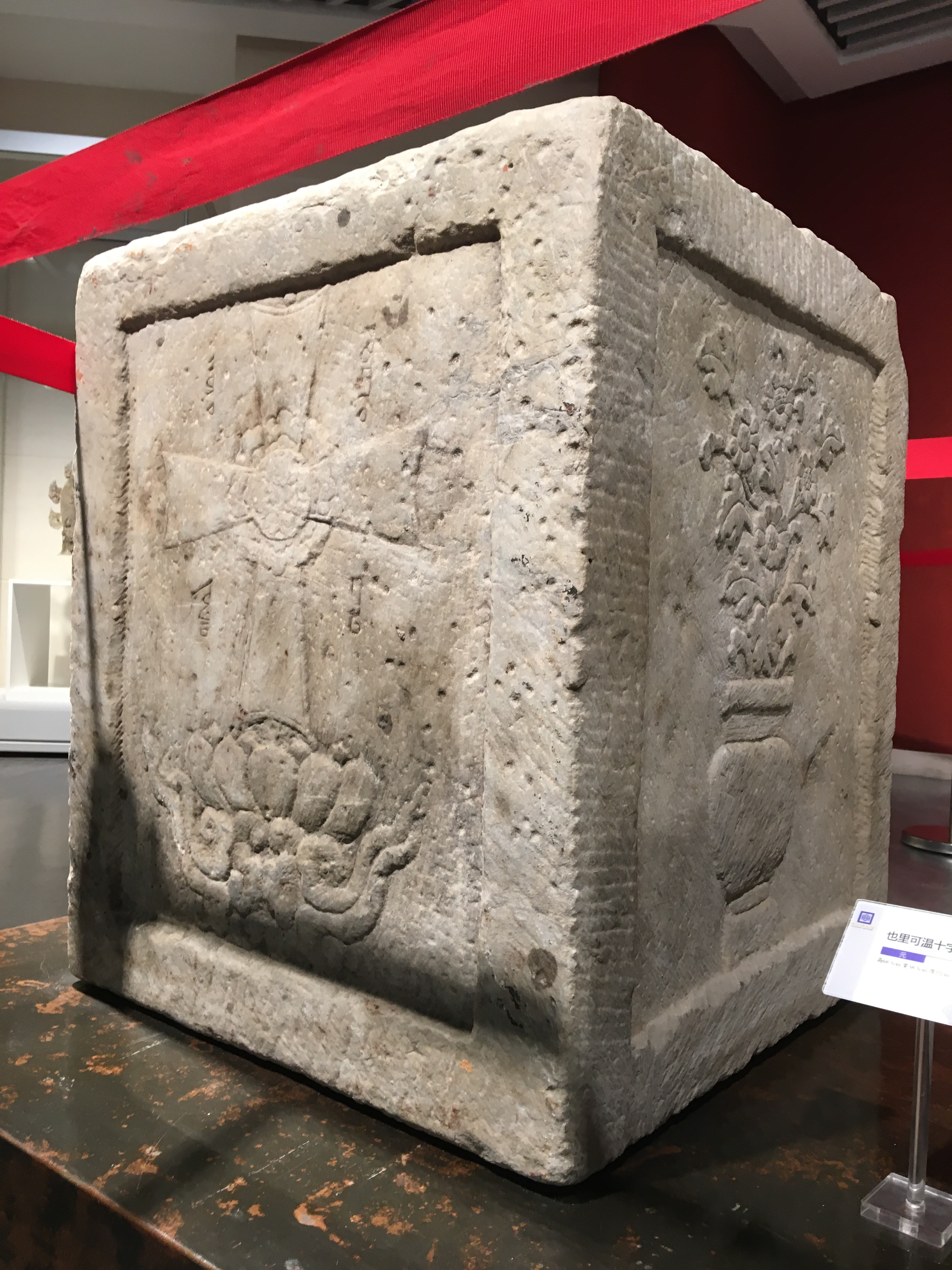
A stone block from the Cross Temple features the Christian cross on a lotus base and a vase of flowers.

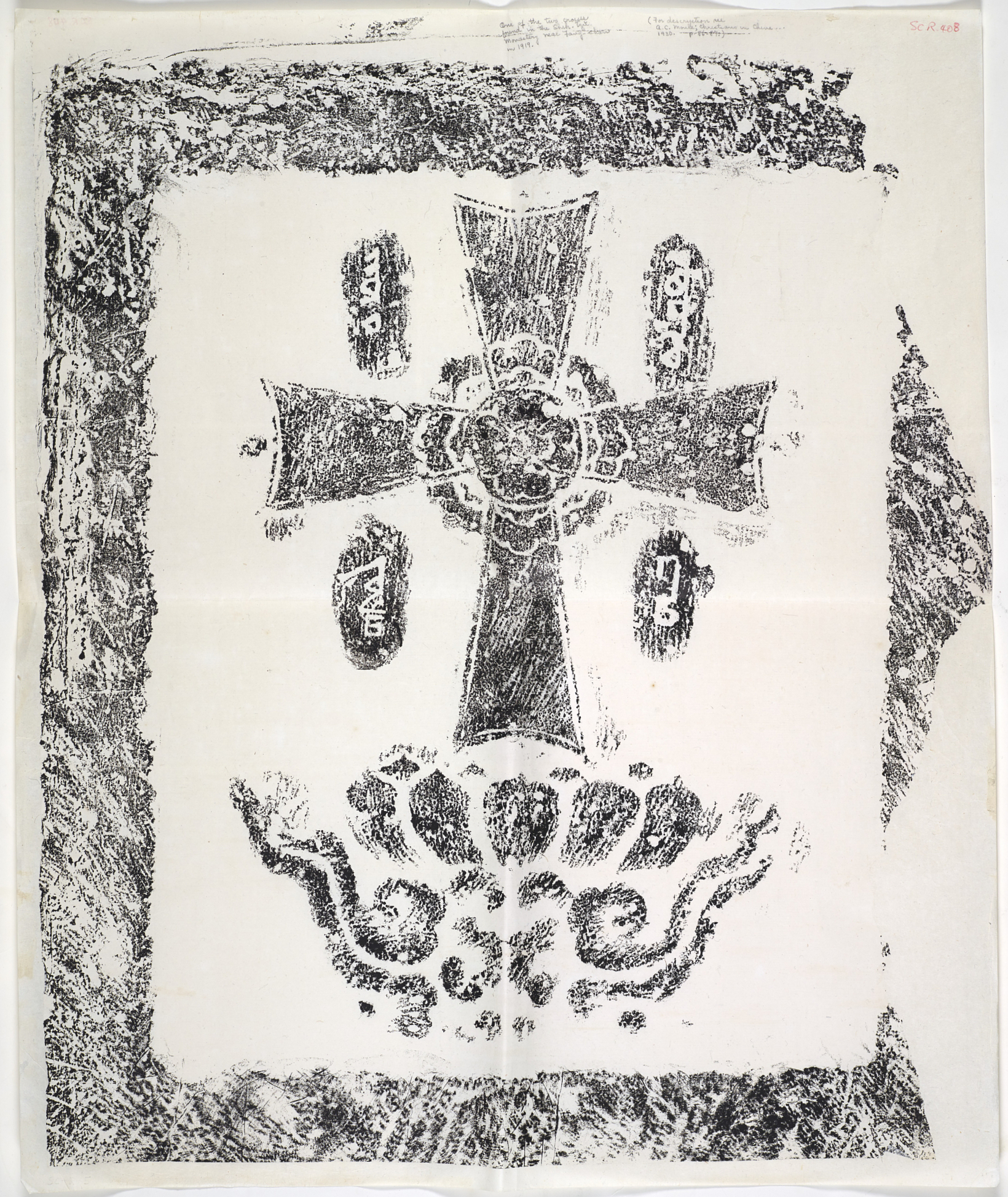
The rubbing of the stone block shows Syriac inscriptions from Psalms 34:5–6 around the cross. The stone block is currently in Nanjing Museum.

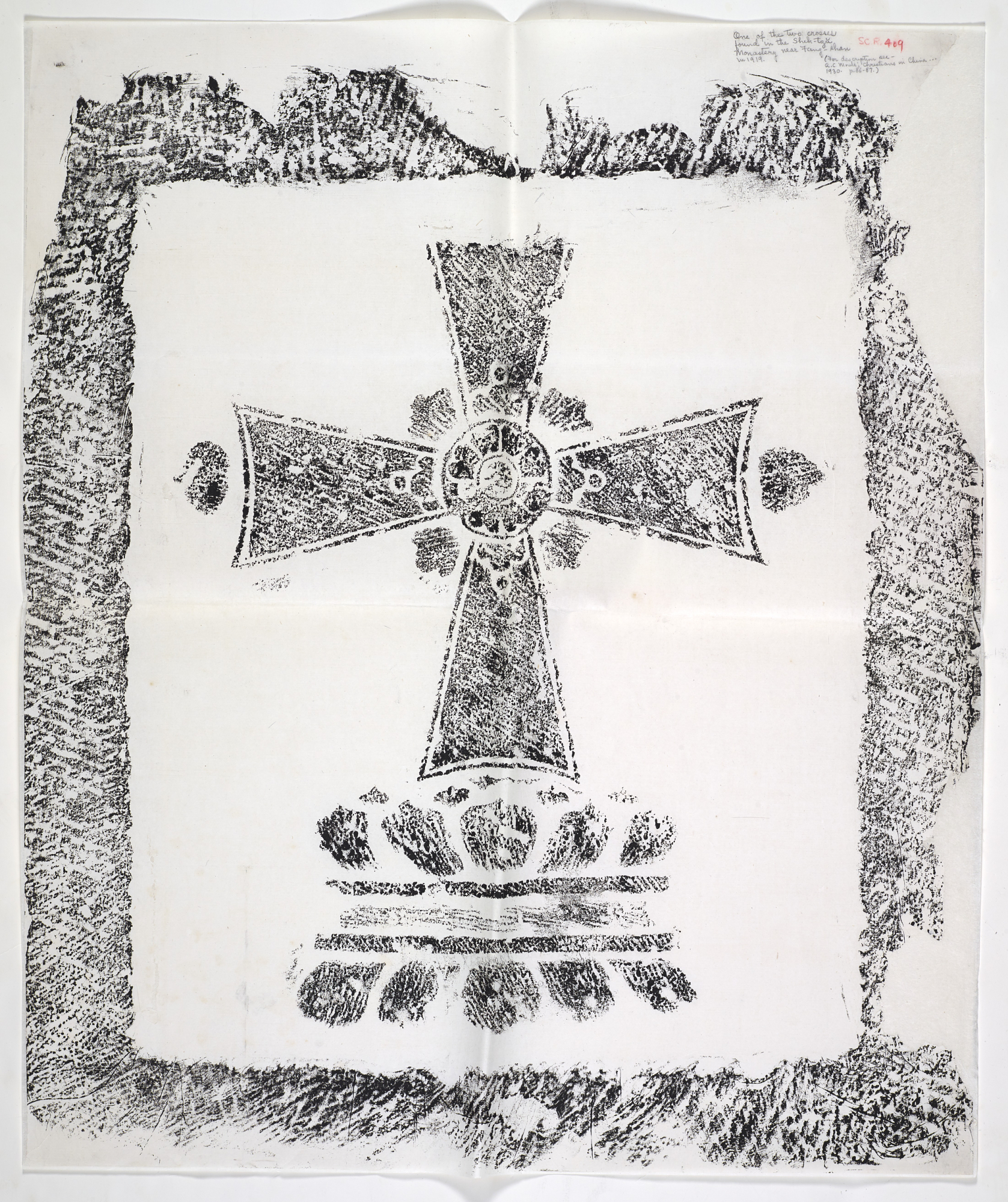
Rubbing of another stone block from the Cross Temple depicting the Christian cross on a lotus base

== See also ==
=== Christianity in Beijing ===
- Cathedral of the Immaculate Conception, Beijing – the oldest Catholic church in Beijing
- Christian-founded institutions: Peking Union Medical College (est. 1906), Yenching University (1919–1952), Fu Jen Catholic University (est. 1925, later re-established in Taiwan in 1961)
- Holy Saviour's Cathedral – a former Anglican cathedral
- Zhalan Cemetery – a Ming dynasty cemetery in Beijing for Catholic missionaries who died in China

=== Other West Asian religious sites in China ===
- Cao'an – a Song dynasty temple originally used by Chinese Manichaeists, now used by Buddhists
- Huaisheng Mosque in Guangzhou, built during the 7th century
- Pearl Temple – a Tang dynasty East Syriac church in Chengdu built no later than 756 AD
- Xianshenlou – the sole surviving Zoroastrian building in China, built during the Song dynasty (960–1279)

== Sources ==
=== Newspapers ===
- Li, Xue (2015-04-27). 北京十字寺遗址保护面临困境 [The Protection of the Site of the Cross Temple in Beijing Faces Difficulty]. China Culture Daily 中国文化报 (in Chinese).

=== Dissertations ===
- Zhou, Yixing (2017). Studies on Nestorian Iconology in China and part of Central Asia during the 13th and 14th Centuries (PDF) (PhD thesis). Ca' Foscari University of Venice.

=== Journal articles ===
- Borbone, Pier Giorgio (2019). "A "Nestorian" Mirror from Inner Mongolia". Egitto e Vicino Oriente. 2019 (XLII). Pisa University Press: 135–149. doi:10.12871/978883339342112. S2CID 234692204.
- Burkitt, F. C. (1 April 1921). "A New Nestorian Monument in China". The Journal of Theological Studies. XXII (3): 269. doi:10.1093/jts/os-XXII.3.269.
- Drake, F. S. (1962). "Nestorian Crosses and Nestorian Christians in China under the Mongols: A Lecture Delivered on December 11, 1961". Journal of the Hong Kong Branch of the Royal Asiatic Society. 2: 11–25. JSTOR 23881247.
- Morris, James H. (July 2017). "Rereading the evidence of the earliest Christian communities in East Asia during and prior to the Táng Period". Missiology. 45 (3). SAGE Publications: 235–267. doi:10.1177/0091829616685352.
- Nicolini-Zani, Matteo (2011). "Reviewed Work(s): East Syriac Christianity in Mongol-Yuan China. Orientalia Biblica et Christiana, vol. 18 by Li Tang". China Review International. 18 (3). University of Hawai'i Press: 354–358. doi:10.1353/cri.2011.0078. JSTOR 23733468. S2CID 142980336.
- Qiu, Shusen (2002). 元亡后基督教在中国湮灭的原因 [The Reason of the Annihilation of Christianity after the Overthrown of the Yuan Dynasty in China]. 世界宗教研究 [Studies in World Religions] (in Chinese). 2002 (4): 56–64, 156.
- Shi, Mingpei (March 2000). 略论景教在中国的活动与北京的景教遗迹 [Jing-jiao (Nestorianism) in China and Its Remains in Beijing]. 北京联合大学学报 北京联合大学学报 [Journal of Beijing Union University] (in Chinese). 14 (1): 90–93. doi:10.16255/j.cnki.ldxbz.2000.01.025.
- Tang, Xiaofeng (2011a). 北京房山十字寺的研究及存疑 [Studies and Questions on the Cross Temple, Fangshan, Beijing]. 世界宗教研究 [Studies in World Religions] (in Chinese). 2011 (6): 118–25.
- Wang, Xiaojing (2018). 房山十字寺辽、元二碑与景教关系考 [A Study on the Relationship between the Two Steles from Liao and Yuan Dynasties at the Cross Temple, Beijing, and the Church of the East in China]. 北京史学 [Beijing History] (in Chinese). 2018 (2): 309–43.
- Xu, Pinfang (1992). 北京房山十字寺也里可温石刻 [Yelikewen Stone Carvings at the Cross Temple, Fangshan, Beijing]. 中国文化 [Chinese Culture] (in Chinese). 1992 (7): 184–89.

=== Book chapters ===
- Borbone, Pier Giorgio (2006). "Peshitta Ps 34:6 from Syria to China". In van Peursen, Willem Th.; Romeny, Bas ter Haar (eds.). Text, Translation, and Tradition: Studies on the Peshitta and its Use in the Syriac Tradition. Brill. ISBN 978-90-474-1057-7.
- Huang, Paulos Z., ed. (2018). "Yearbook of Chinese Theology 2018". Yearbook of Chinese Theology. Vol. 4. BRILL. ISBN 978-90-04-38497-2.
  - Mooken, Aprem. "The Church of the East in China (Jingjiao)". In Huang (2018), pp. 71–81.
  - Tang, Xiaofeng; Zhang, Yingying. "Fangshan Cross Temple (房山十字寺) in China: Overview, Analysis and Hypotheses". In Huang (2018), pp. 82–94.
- Malek, Roman, ed. (2006). Jingjiao: The Church of the East in China and Central Asia. Institut Monumenta Serica. ISBN 3-8050-0534-2.
  - Hofrichter, Peter L. Preface. In Malek (2006), pp. 11–14.
  - Niu, Ruiji. "Nestorian Inscriptions from China (13th–14th c.)". In Malek (2006), pp. 209–242.
- Marsone, Pierre (2013). "When Was the Temple of the Cross at Fangshan a 'Christian Temple'?". In Tang, Li; Winkler, Dietmar W. (eds.). From the Oxus River to the Chinese Shores: Studies on East Syriac Christianity in China and Central Asia. LIT Verlag Münster. ISBN 978-3-643-90329-7 – via Google Books.

=== Books ===
- Moule, A. C. (2011) [1930]. Christians in China Before the Year 1550. Beijing: Gorgias Press. ISBN 978-1-61143-605-1.
- Standaert, Nicolas, ed. (2001). Handbook of Christianity in China, Volume One: 635–1800. Leiden: Brill. ISBN 90-04-11431-9. ISSN 0169-9520.
- Tang, Li (2011b). East Syriac Christianity in Mongol-Yuan China (12th–14th centuries). Harrassowitz Verlag. doi:10.2307/j.ctvc16hhv.
