= Stele Forest =

Museum of steles and sculptures in Xi'an, China

Coordinates: 34.252459°N 108.952809°E

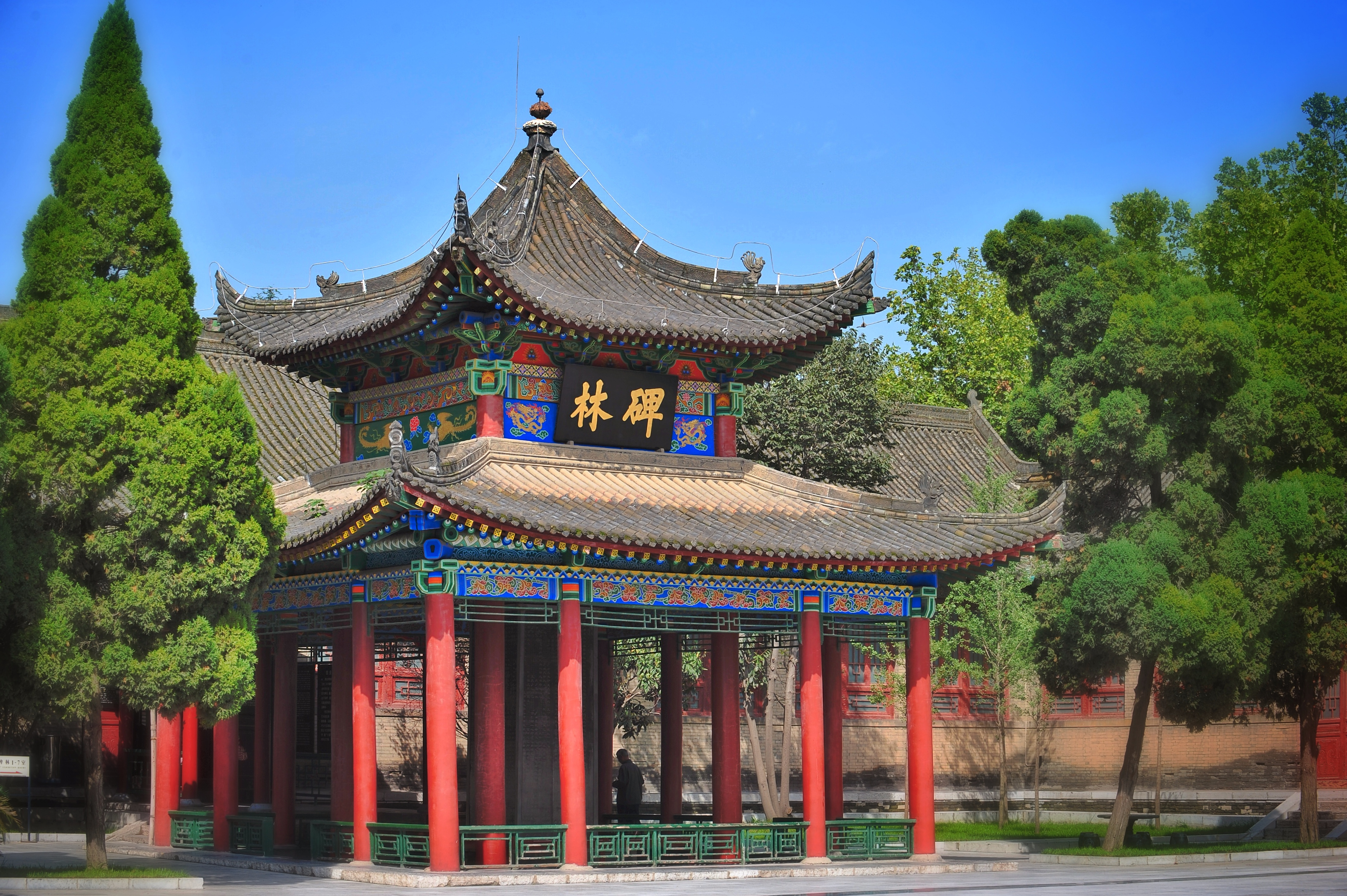
- The pavilion of the stele of Shitai Xiaojing
- Chinese: 碑林
Transcriptions
Standard Mandarin
- Hanyu Pinyin: Bēilín
- Wade–Giles: Pei-lin

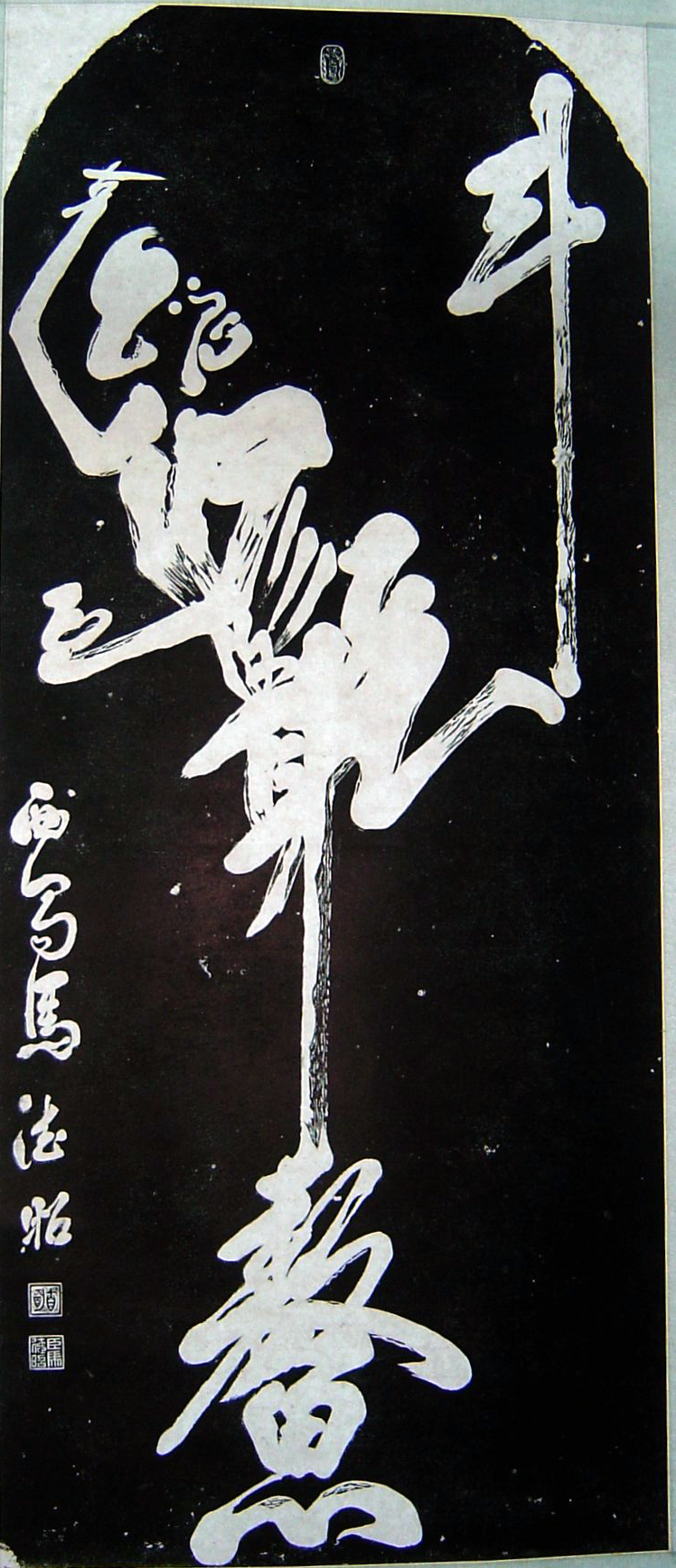
An ink rubbing of one of the calligraphy stela at the Beilin Museum in Xi'an, called the "God of Literature Pointing the Dipper." It depicts the figure, made up of the characters describing the four Confucian virtues, "pointing the dipper" (an expression for coming first in the imperial civil service examinations).

The Xi'an Beilin Museum (simplified Chinese: 西安碑林博物馆; traditional Chinese: 西安碑林博物館; pinyin: Xī'ān Bēilín Bówùguǎn), commonly known as the Stele Forest, is a museum of inscribed stone monuments and stone sculpture in Beilin District, Xi'an. Its historical collection was established at the local Confucian temple and prefectural school in 1087. The museum preserves texts and sculptures dating from the Han dynasty to the Qing dynasty, including Confucian classics, major works of Chinese calligraphy, religious inscriptions and funerary sculpture.

== History ==
The collection developed around two groups of Tang stone texts: the Kaicheng Stone Classics and the Stone Platform Classic of Filial Piety. The Kaicheng project, commissioned under Emperor Wenzong of Tang, engraved twelve Confucian classics between 833 and 837. Its 114 stones carry more than 650,000 characters and were first erected at the Imperial College in Chang'an.

After the fall of the Tang, the stones were moved several times within the reduced city. They were installed at the prefectural school in 1087, an event generally treated as the foundation of the present Stele Forest. The site remained a Confucian temple and school through the imperial period. Most surviving buildings date from the Ming and Qing dynasties.

== Collection ==
The museum holds nearly 3,000 steles and a large collection of carved stone. In addition to preserving the texts of the Confucian classics, the stones document the development of Chinese scripts and calligraphic practice over many centuries.

Among the calligraphic monuments are the Eastern Han Cao Quan Stele, the Song recarving of the Qin Mount Yi Stele, and Tang works associated with Ouyang Xun, Yan Zhenqing, Huaisu and Liu Gongquan. The original Yan Family Temple Stele by Yan Zhenqing is preserved in the museum; its standard script influenced later calligraphy and printing. The museum's Song recarving of the Mount Yi inscription transmitted a version of the small-seal text traditionally attributed to Li Si.

The collection also includes the Xi'an Stele, erected in 781 with Chinese and Syriac text recording the presence of the Church of the East in Tang China. It was transferred to the museum in 1907 after the Danish visitor Frits Holm attempted to acquire it for removal abroad.

== Stone sculpture ==
The stone-sculpture galleries contain Buddhist images, tomb sculpture and four of the Six Steeds of Zhao Mausoleum, reliefs commissioned for the mausoleum of Emperor Taizong of Tang. The remaining two reliefs are held by the Penn Museum in Philadelphia.
