= Sutra of Hearing the Messiah =

Chinese language manuscript

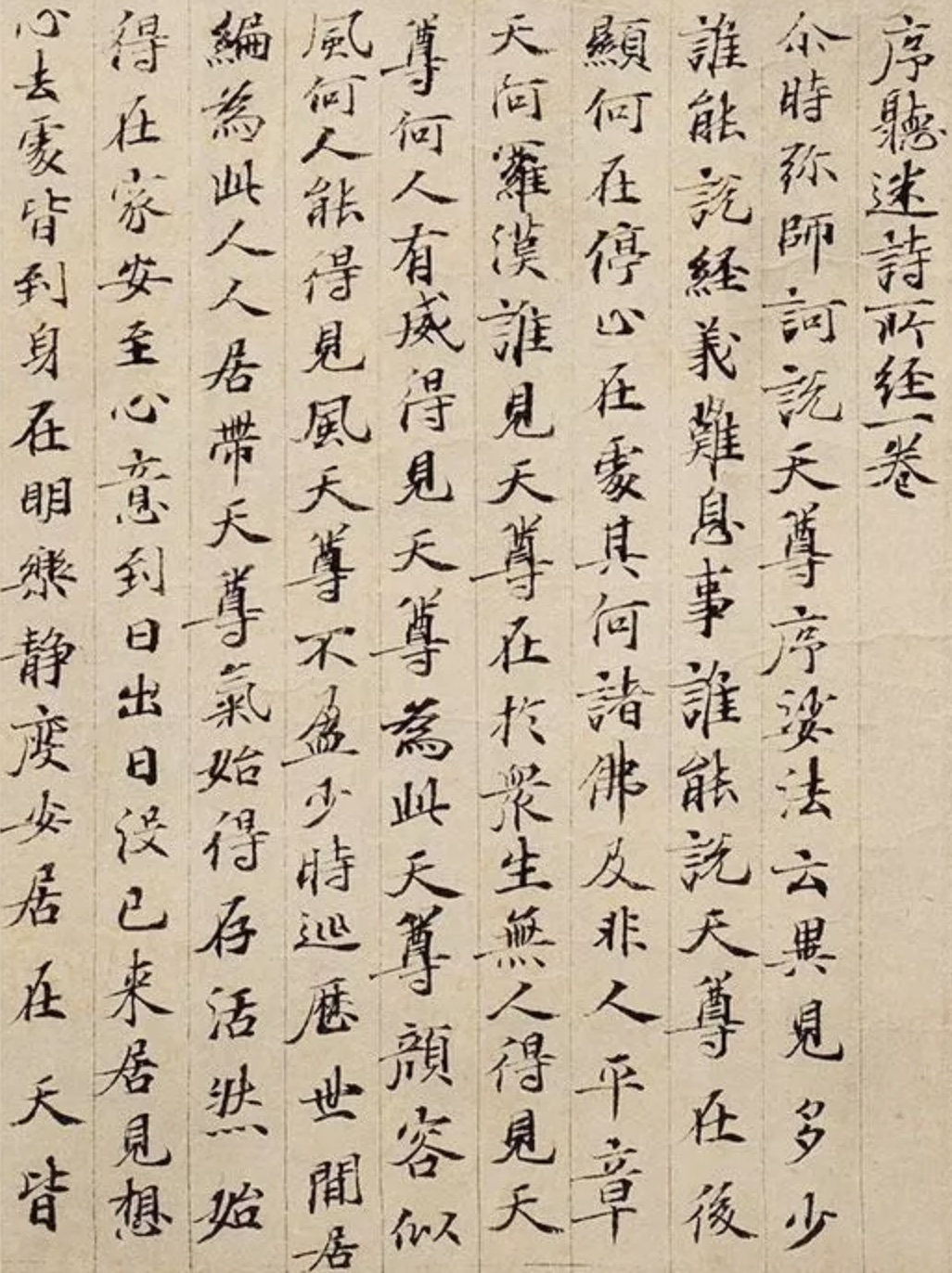
Sutra of Hearing the Messiah, now held in Kyōu Shooku library, Osaka, Japan.

The Sutra of Hearing the Messiah (Chinese: 序聽迷詩所經; pinyin: Xùtīng Míshīsuǒ Jīng) is a Chinese language manuscript about Christian teachings from the Church of the East. It is considered to be one of the oldest of the Jingjiao Documents, dated between 635 AD and 638 AD. The Sutra of Hearing the Messiah was found at the Mogao Caves in Dunhuang and collected by Takakusu Junjiro.

== Contents ==
Composed of 206 verses, the document provides a basic outline of the fundamental teachings of Christianity. It begins with twenty verses of invocation about the invisible God and to the heavenly spirits that serve him, followed by a description of humanity and the distance caused by sin and the condition of mortality. The text continues to speak of the virgin birth and the death of Jesus Christ. The manuscript is incomplete, ending abruptly and mid-verse discussing Jesus' death.

== Chinese Terms ==
This document is thought to have been one of the early missionary devices of the Church of the East, dating around the time of Bishop Alopen, a Syriac-speaking Persian. The translations of names and religious terms in this text are different to the modern translations, and in some cases show influence from Buddhism. Some examples of translations of names are given in the table below.

English	Manuscript translation	Modern translation
Messiah	Chinese: 彌師訶; pinyin: míshīhē	Chinese: 彌賽亞; pinyin: mísàiyà
Jesus	Chinese: 移鼠; pinyin: yíshǔ	Chinese: 耶穌; pinyin: yēsū
God	Chinese: 天尊; pinyin: tiānzūn; lit. 'Celestial Venerable'	Chinese: 神; pinyin: shén
Holy Spirit	Chinese: 涼風; pinyin: liáng fēng; lit. 'cool wind'	Chinese: 聖靈; pinyin: shèng líng
Mary	Chinese: 末豔; pinyin: mòyàn (from Syriac Maryam)	Chinese: 馬利亞; pinyin: mǎlìyà
Bethlehem	Chinese: 拂林園; pinyin: fúlínyuán	Chinese: 伯利恆; pinyin: bólìhéng
Jerusalem	Chinese: 烏梨師斂; pinyin: wūlíshīliǎn (from Syriac Ūrišlem)	Chinese: 耶路撒冷; pinyin: yélùsǎlěng
