= Xi'an Stele =

Tang Chinese Christian stele (est. 781)

Coordinates: 34.16°N 108.56°E

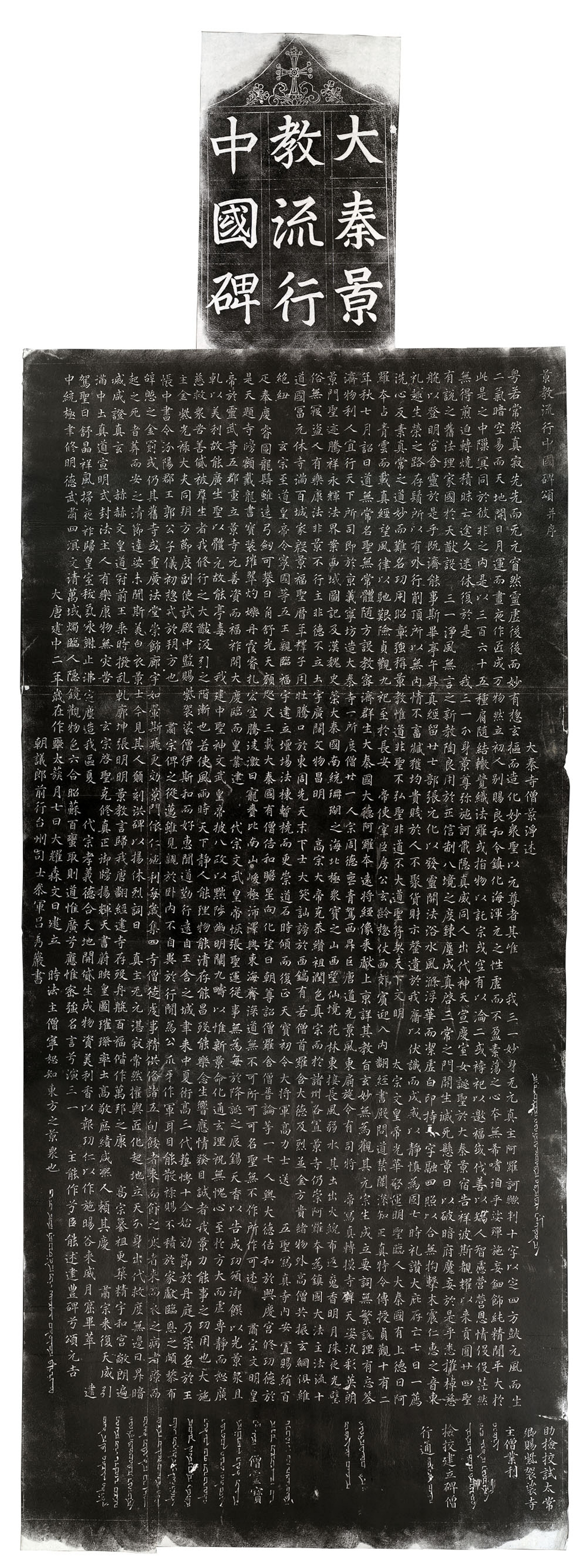
- The stele entitled 大秦景教流行中國碑 was erected in China in 781.
- Type: Stele
- Material: Limestone
- Height: 2.79 metres (9 ft 2 in)
- Writing: Middle Chinese; Syriac language
- Symbols: Nestorian cross
- Discovered: Late Ming dynasty (1621–1625); Chongren Temple (崇仁寺)
- Present location: Stele Forest, Xi'an, China
- Webpage on the Stele Forest website

Chinese name
- Traditional Chinese: 大秦景教流行中國碑
- Simplified Chinese: 大秦景教流行中国碑
- Literal meaning: Stele to the Propagation in China of the Jingjiao (Luminous Religion) of Daqin (Roman Empire)
Transcriptions
Standard Mandarin
- Hanyu Pinyin: Dàqín Jǐngjiào Liúxíng Zhōngguó Bēi
Yue: Cantonese
- Jyutping: Daai^{6} Ceon^{4} Ging^{2} Gaau^{3} Lau^{4} Hang^{4} Zung^{1} Gwok^{3} Bei^{1}
Middle Chinese
- Middle Chinese: /dɑi^{H}.d͡ziɪn kˠiæŋ^{X}.kˠau^{H} lɨu.ɦˠæŋ ʈɨuŋ.kwək̚ pˠiᴇ/

Alternative Chinese name
- Chinese: 景教碑
- Literal meaning: Luminous Religion Stele
Transcriptions
Standard Mandarin
- Hanyu Pinyin: Jǐngjiào Bēi
Yue: Cantonese
- Jyutping: Ging^{2} Gaau^{3} Bei^{1}

The Xi'an Stele or the Jingjiao Stele (Chinese: 景教碑; pinyin: Jǐngjiào bēi; lit. 'Nestorian Stele') is a stele, erected in 781 during the Tang dynasty, that documents approximately 150 years of early Christianity in China. It is a limestone block 279 centimetres (9 ft 2 in) high with text in both Chinese and Syriac describing the existence of Christian communities in several cities in northern China. It reveals that the initial Church of the East had met recognition by the Tang Emperor Taizong, due to efforts of the Christian missionary Alopen in 635. According to the stele, Alopen and his fellow Syriac missionaries came to China from Daqin (the Eastern Roman Empire) in the ninth year of Emperor Taizong (635), bringing sacred books and images. The Church of the East monk Adam (Jingjing in Chinese) composed the text on the stele. Buried in 845, probably during the Huichang persecution of Buddhism, the stele was not rediscovered until 1625. It is now in the Stele Forest in Xi'an.

== Discovery ==
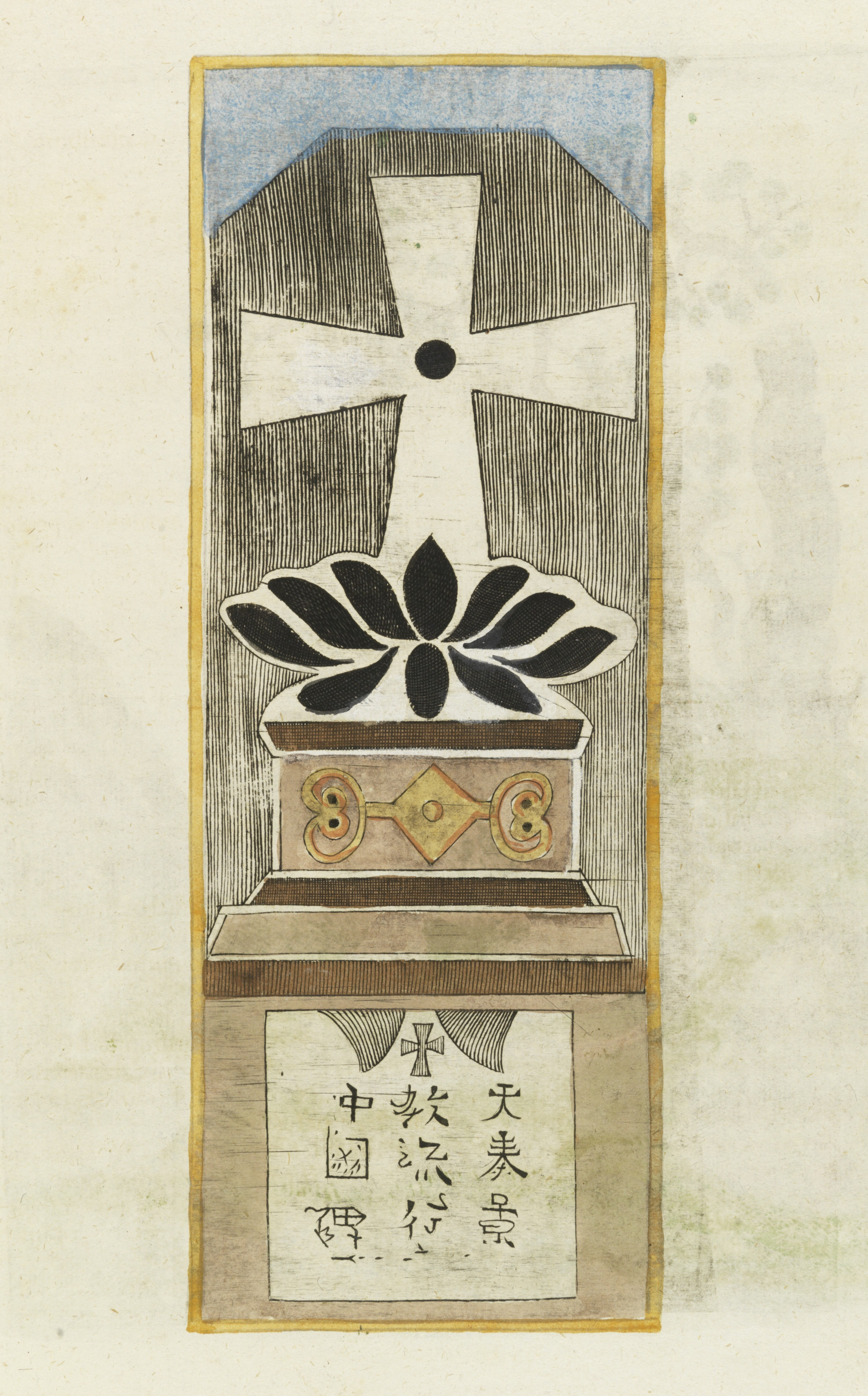
Michał Boym, Flora Sinensis, 1656

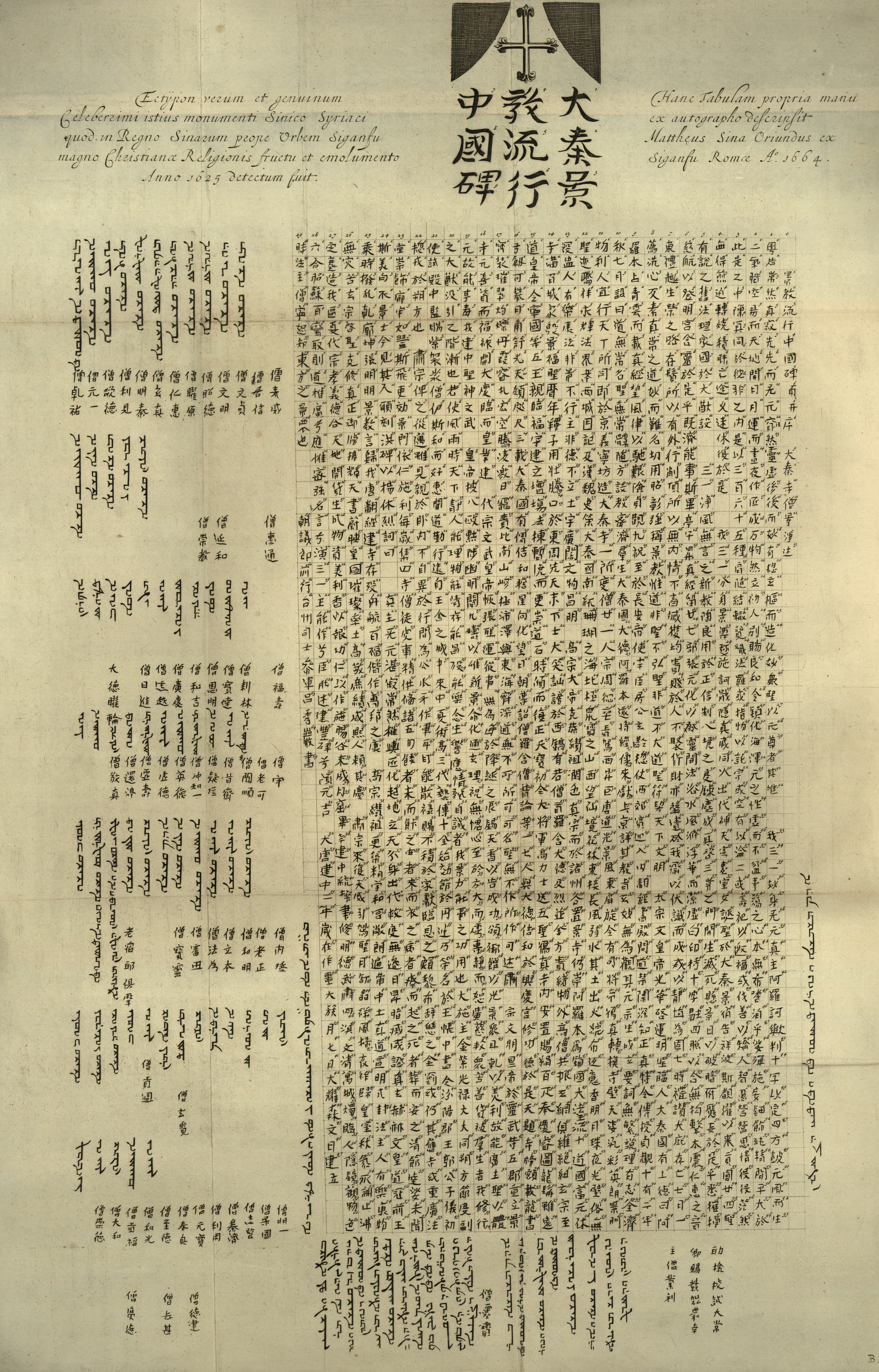
Athanasius Kircher, China Monumentis, 1667

The stele is thought to have been buried in 845, during the Huichang persecution, which also affected Christians.

The stele was unearthed in the late Ming dynasty (between 1621 and 1625) beside Chongren Temple (崇仁寺) outside of Xi'an. According to the account by the Jesuit Alvaro Semedo, the workers who found the stele immediately reported the find to the governor, who soon visited the monument, and had it installed on a pedestal under a protective roof, requesting the nearby Buddhist monastery to care for it.

The newly discovered stele attracted attention of local intellectuals. It was Zhang Gengyou (Wade-Giles: Chang Keng-yu) who first identified the text as Christian in content. Zhang, who had been aware of Christianity through Matteo Ricci, and who himself may have been Christian, sent a copy of the stele's Chinese text to his Christian friend, Leon Li Zhizao in Hangzhou, who in his turn published the text and told the locally based Jesuits about it.

Alvaro Semedo was the first European to visit the stele (some time between 1625 and 1628). Nicolas Trigault's Latin translation of the monument's inscription soon made its way in Europe, and was apparently first published in a French translation, in 1628. Portuguese and Italian translations, and a Latin re-translation, were soon published as well. Semedo's account of the monument's discovery was published in 1641, in his Imperio de la China.

Early Jesuits attempted to claim that the stele was erected by a historical community of Roman Catholics in China, called Nestorianism a heresy, and claimed that it was Catholics who first brought Christianity to China. But later historians and writers admitted that it was indeed from the Church of the East and not the Roman Catholic Church.

The first publication of the original Chinese and Syriac text of the inscription in Europe is attributed to Athanasius Kircher. China Illustrata edited by Kircher (1667) included a reproduction of the original inscription in Chinese characters, romanization of the text, and a Latin translation. This was perhaps the first sizeable Chinese text made available in its original form to the European public. A sophisticated romanization system, reflecting Chinese tones, used to transcribe the text, was the one developed earlier by Matteo Ricci's collaborator Lazzaro Cattaneo (1560–1640).

The work of the transcription and translation was carried out by Michał Boym and two young Chinese Christians who visited Rome in the 1650s and 1660s: Boym's traveling companion Andreas Zheng (郑安德勒) and, later, another person who signed in Latin as "Matthaeus Sina". D.E. Mungello suggests that Matthaeus Sina may have been the person who traveled overland from China to Europe with Johann Grueber.

== Content ==
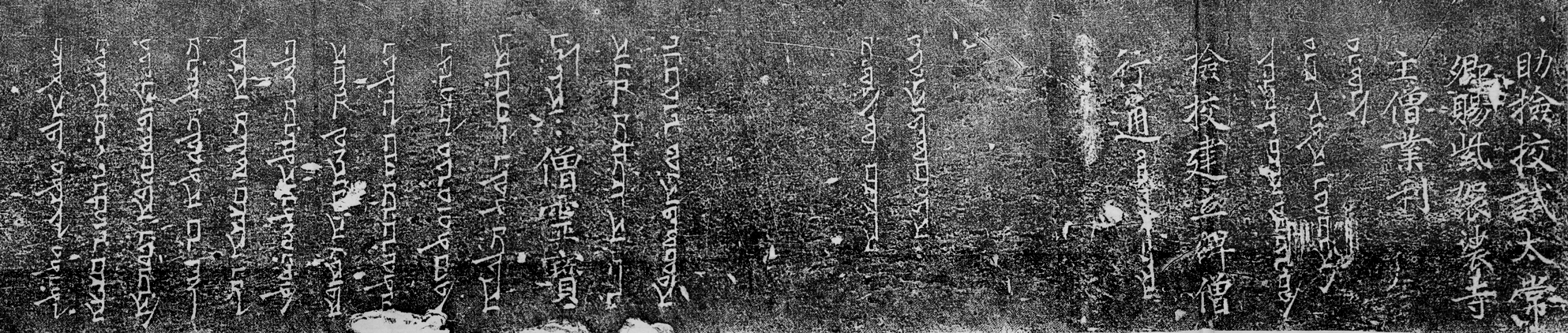
Syriac text at the bottom of the stele: "In the year of the Greeks one thousand and ninety-two, the Lord Yazedbuzid, Priest and Vicar-episcopal of Cumdan the royal city, son of the enlightened Mailas, Priest of Balach a city of Turkestan, set up this tablet, whereon is inscribed the Dispensation of our Redeemer, and the preaching of the apostolic missionaries to the King of China. ["The Priest Lingpau", in Chinese] "Adam the Deacon, son of Yazedbuzid, vicar-episcopal. The Lord Sergius, Priest and Vicar-episcopal. Sabar Jesus, Priest. Gabriel, Priest, Archdeacon, and Ecclesiarch of Cumdan and Sarag."

The heading on the stone, Chinese for Memorial of the Propagation in China of the Luminous Religion from Daqin (大秦景教流行中國碑, abbreviated 大秦景教碑). An even more abbreviated version of the title, 景教碑 (Jǐngjiào bēi, "The Stele of the Luminous Religion"), in its Wade-Giles form, Ching-chiao-pei or Chingchiaopei, was used by some Western writers to refer to the stele as well.

The name of the stele can also be translated as A Monument Commemorating the Propagation of the Ta-Chin Luminous Religion in the Middle Kingdom (the church referred to itself as "The Luminous Religion of Daqin", Daqin being the Chinese language term for the Roman Empire in the 1st and 2nd centuries AD, and in later eras also used to refer to the Syriac Christian churches).

=== Authorship ===
The stele was erected on February 4, 781 ("Jianzhong 2, Taicu month, 7th day" in the inscription), at the imperial capital city of Chang'an (modern-day Xi'an), or at nearby Zhouzhi County. The calligraphy was by Lü Xiuyan (呂秀巖), and the content was composed by the Church of the East monk Jingjing in the four- and six-character euphemistic style (大秦寺僧㬌淨述, "Related by Jingjing, monk of the Daqin Temple"). A gloss in Syriac identifies Jingjing with "Adam, priest, chorepiscopus and papash of Sinistan" (ܐܕܡ ܩܫܝܫܐ ܘܟܘܪܐܦܝܣܩܘܦܐ ܘܦܐܦܫܝ ܕܨܝܢܝܣܬܐܢ Adam qshisha w'kurapisqupa w'papash d'Sinistan). Although the term papash (literally "pope") is unusual and the normal Syriac name for China is Beth Sinaye, not Sinistan, there is no reason to doubt that Adam was the metropolitan of the Church of the East ecclesiastical province of Beth Sinaye, created a half-century earlier during the reign of Patriarch Sliba-zkha (714–28). A Syriac dating formula refers to the Church of the East patriarch Hnanishoʿ II (773–780), news of whose death several months earlier had evidently not yet reached the Church of the East of Chang'an. In fact, the reigning Church of the East patriarch in January 781 was Timothy I (780–823), who had been consecrated in Baghdad on 7 May 780. The names of several higher clergy (one bishop, two chorepiscopi and two archdeacons) and around seventy monks or priests are listed. The names of the higher clergy appear on the front of the stone while those of the priests and monks are inscribed in rows along the narrow sides of the stone, in both Syriac and Chinese. In some cases, the Chinese names are phonetically close to the Syriac originals, but in many other cases, they bear little resemblance to them. Some of the Church of the East monks had distinctive Persian names (such as Isadsafas, Gushnasap), suggesting that they might have come from Fars or elsewhere in Persia, but most of them had common Christian names or the kind of compound Syriac name (such as ʿAbdishoʿ, 'servant of Jesus') much in vogue among all Church of the East Christians. In such cases, it is impossible to guess at their place of origin.

=== Content ===
On top of the tablet, there is a cross. Below this headpiece is a long Chinese inscription, consisting of around 1,900 Chinese characters, sometimes glossed in Syriac (several sentences amounting to about 50 Syriac words). Referring to God using the title 真主, Pinyin: Zhēnzhǔ (literally "Veritable Majesty" or "True Lord"), the text refers to Genesis, the cross, and baptism. It also pays tribute to missionaries and benefactors of the church, who are known to have arrived in China by 640. The text contains the name of an early missionary, Alopen. The tablet describes the "Illustrious Religion" and emphasizes the Trinity and the Incarnation, but there is nothing about Christ's crucifixion or resurrection. Other Chinese elements referred to include a wooden bell, beard, tonsure, and renunciation. The Syriac proper names for God, Christ and Satan (Allaha, Mshiha and Satana) were rendered phonetically into Chinese. Chinese transliterations were also made of one or two words of Sanskrit origin such as Sphatica and Dasa. There is also a Persian word denoting Sunday.

Yazedbuzid (Yisi in Chinese) helped the Tang dynasty general Guo Ziyi militarily crush the Sogdian-Turk led An Lushan rebellion, with Yisi personally acting as a military commander and Yisi and the Church of the East were rewarded by the Tang dynasty with titles and positions as described in the Xi'an Stele.

== Debate ==
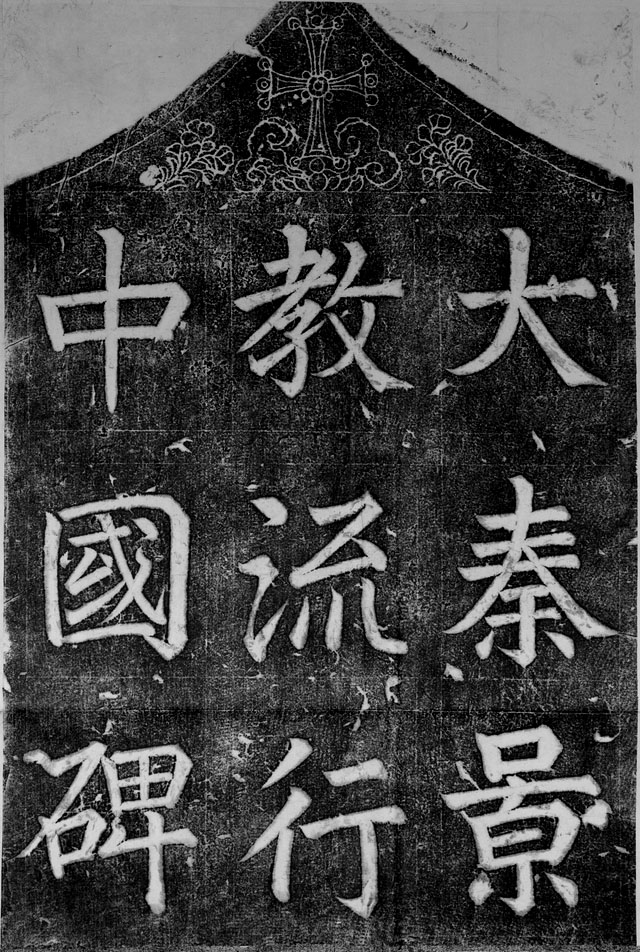
Title of the stele: "Stele to the Propagation in China of the Luminous Religion (Church of the East) of the Roman Empire (Daqin)"

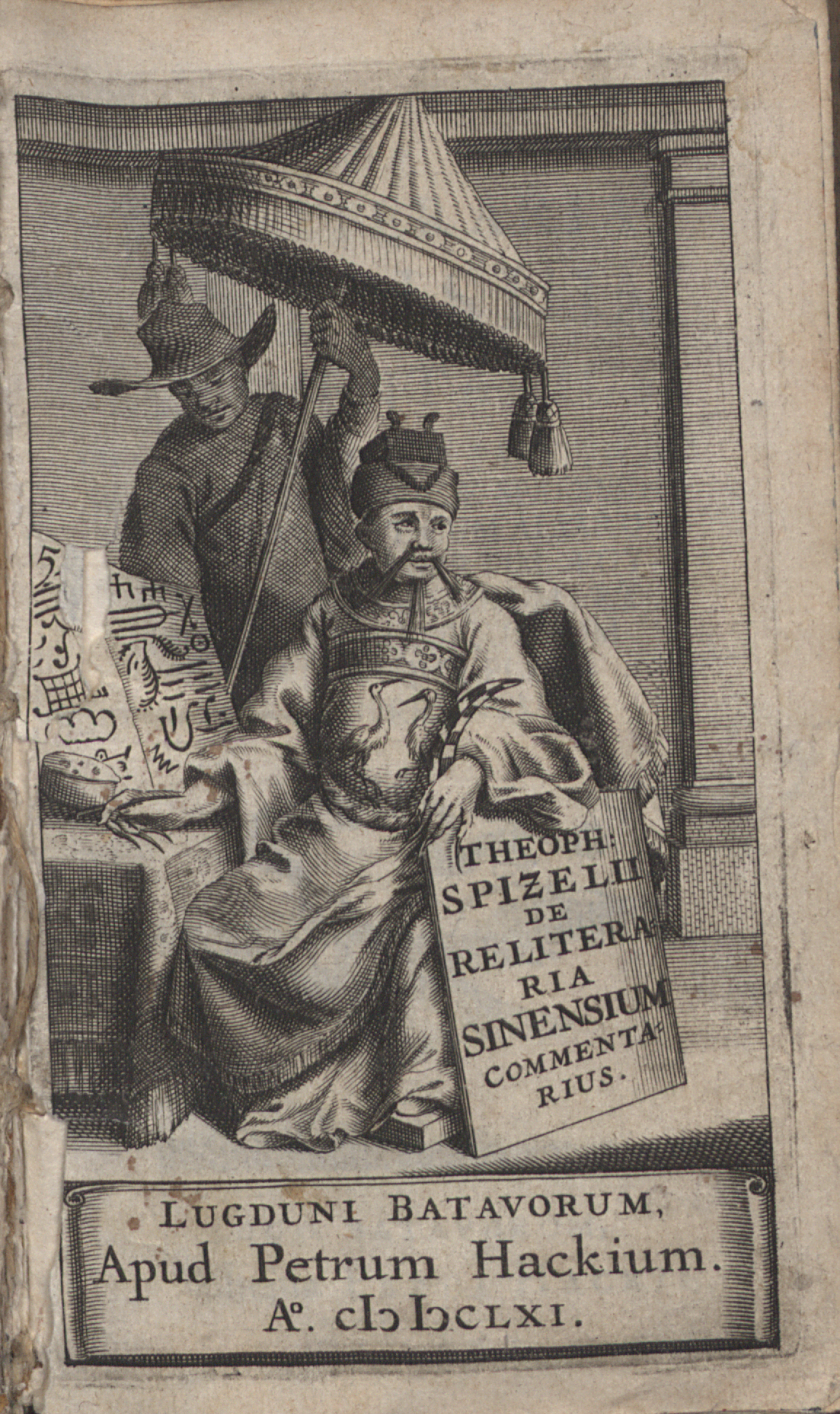
Theophil Gottlieb Spitzel, De re literaria Sinensium commentarius, 1660

The Xi'an Stele attracted the attention of some anti-Christian, Protestant anti-Catholic, or Catholic anti-Jesuit groups in the 17th century, who argued that the stone was a fake or that the inscriptions had been modified by the Jesuits who served in the Ming Court. The three most prominent early skeptics were the German-Dutch Presbyterian scholar Georg Horn (1620–1670) (De originibus Americanis, 1652), the German historian Gottlieb Spitzel (1639–1691) (De re literaria Sinensium commentarius, 1660), and the Dominican missionary Domingo Navarrete (1618–1686) (Tratados historicos, politicos, ethicos, y religiosos de la monarchia de China, 1676). Later, Navarrete's point of view was taken up by French Jansenists and Voltaire.

By the 19th century, the debate had become less sectarian and more scholarly. Notable skeptics included Karl Friedrich Neumann, Stanislas Julien, Edward E. Salisbury and Charles Wall. Ernest Renan initially had "grave doubts", but eventually changed his mind in the light of later scholarship, in favor of the stele's genuineness. The defenders included some non-Jesuit scholars, such as Alexander Wylie, James Legge, and Jean-Pierre-Guillaume Pauthier, although the most substantive work in defense of the stele's authenticity – the three-volume La stèle chrétienne de Si-ngan-fou (1895 to 1902) was authored by the Jesuit scholar Henri Havret (1848–1902).

Paul Pelliot (1878–1945) did an extensive amount of research on the stele, which, however, was only published posthumously, in 1984 (a second edition, revised by Forte was then published in 1996). His and Havret's works are still regarded as the two "standard books" on the subject.

== Modern location, and replicas ==
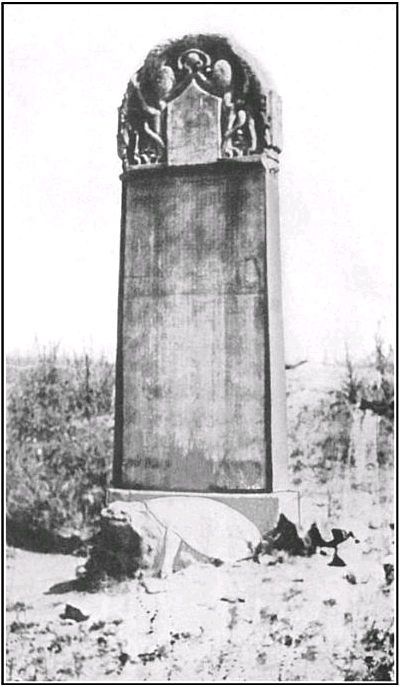
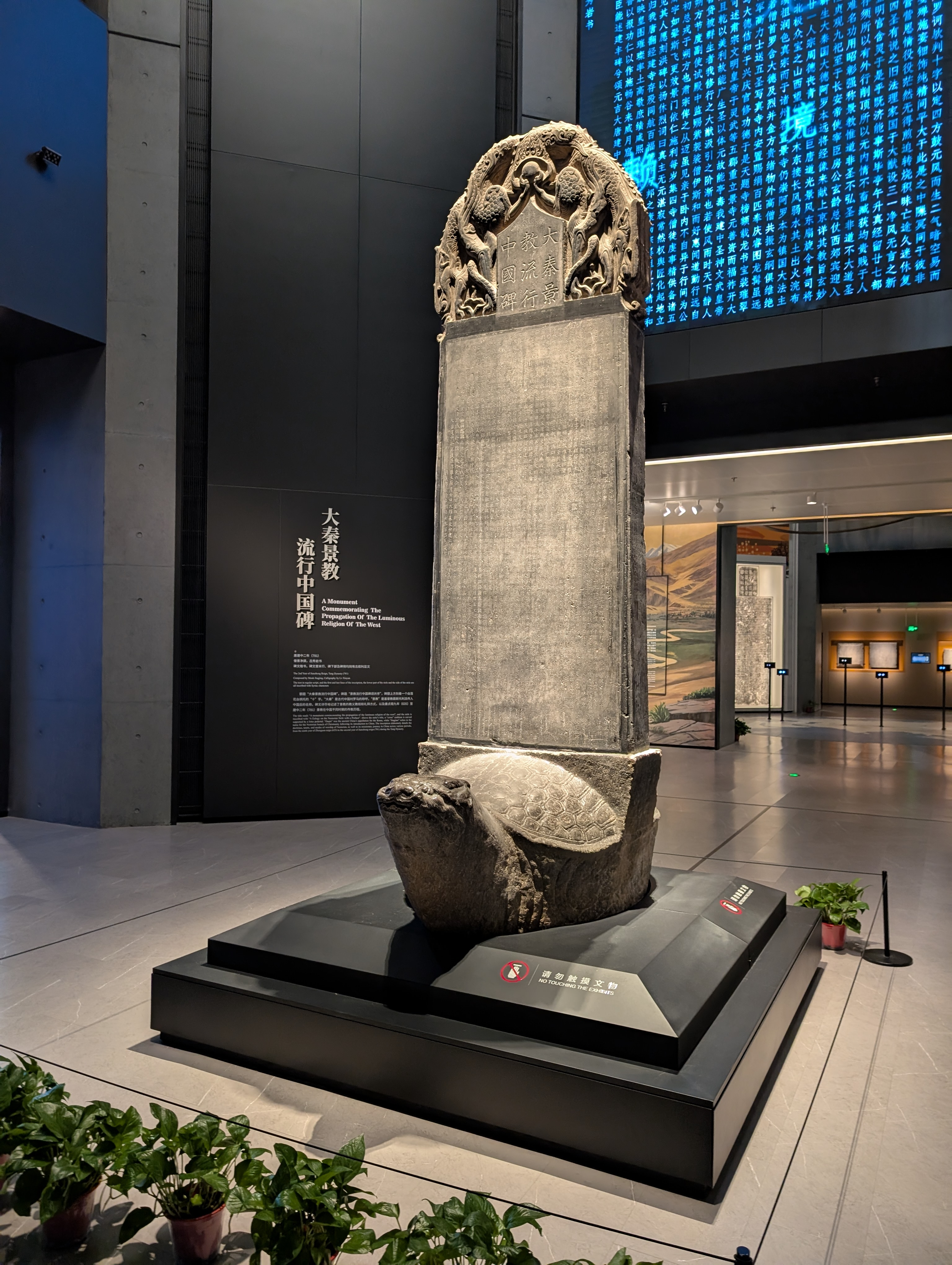
The Xi'an Stele, on its turtle (Bixi) pedestal. Left: 1907 photograph by Frits Holm, without the brick cladding/pavilion seen in earlier pictures and shortly before it was moved to the Beilin Museum. Right: The Xi'an Stele in Beilin Museum in 2026.

Since the late 19th century a number of European scholars opined in favor of somehow getting the stele out of China and into the British Museum or some other "suitable" location (e.g., Frederic H. Balfour in his letter published in The Times in early 1886). The Danish scholar and adventurer Frits Holm came to Xi'an in 1907 planning to take the monument for himself to Europe. Local authorities prevented him and moved the stele, complete with its tortoise, from its location near Chongren Temple to Xi'an's Beilin Museum (Forest of Steles Museum).

Holm had an exact copy of the stele made for him and had the replica stele shipped to New York, planning to sell it to the Metropolitan Museum of Art. The museum's director Caspar Purdon Clarke, however, was less than enthusiastic about purchasing "so large a stone ... of no artistic value". Nonetheless, the replica stele was exhibited in the museum ("on loan" from Mr. Holm) for about 10 years. Eventually, in 1917 some Mrs. George Leary, a wealthy New Yorker, purchased the replica stele from Holm and sent it to Rome, as a gift to the Pope. Another full-sized replica cast from that replica, gifted by Mrs. George Leary in 1919, is on permanent display in the Bunn Intercultural Center on the campus of Georgetown University (Washington, D.C.).

The original Xi'an Stele remains in the Forest of Steles. It is now exhibited on the museum's B2 floor, in a prominent display. When the official list of Chinese cultural relics forbidden to be exhibited abroad was promulgated in 2003, the stele was included into this short list of particularly valuable and important items.

Other copies of the stele and its tortoise can be found near Xi'an Daqin Pagoda, on Mount Kōya in Japan, and, in Tianhe Church, Guangzhou.

== Other early Christian monuments in China ==
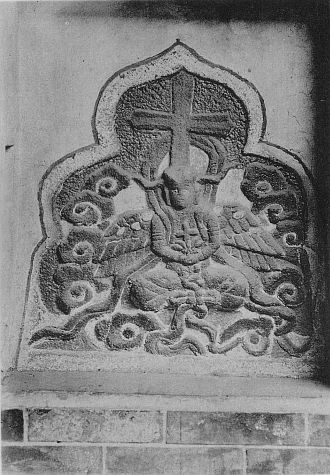
A Nestorian tombstone from Quanzhou

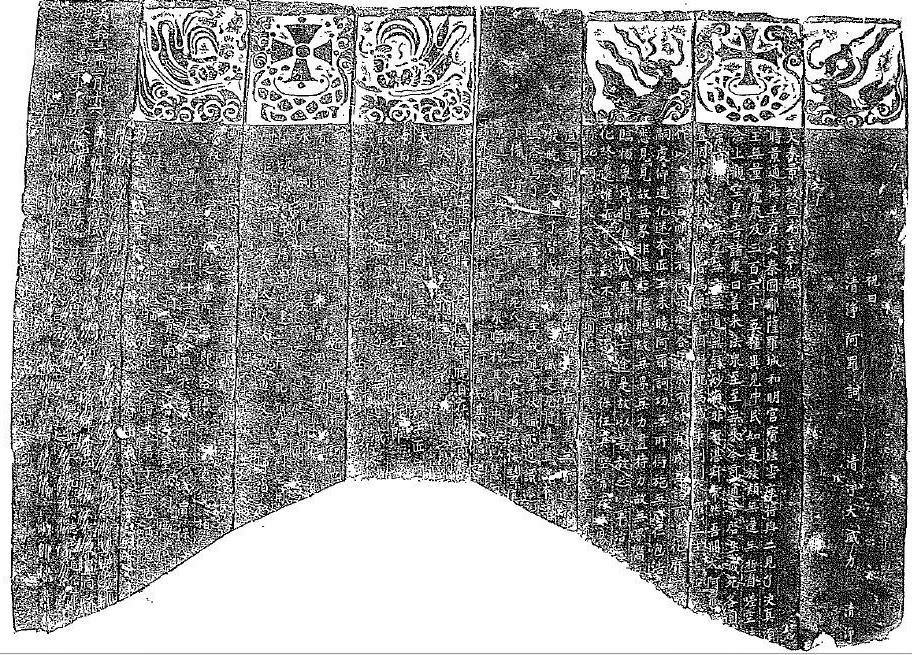
Nestorian pillar of Luoyang, established in 815 and discovered in 2006.

Numerous Christian gravestones have also been found in China in the Xinjiang region, Quanzhou and elsewhere from a somewhat later period. There are also two much later stelae (from 960 and 1365) presenting a curious mix of Christian and Buddhist aspects, which are preserved at the site of the former Monastery of the Cross in the Fangshan District, near Beijing.

In 2006, a mortuary stone pillar with Church of the East inscriptions was discovered in Luoyang, the Nestorian pillar of Luoyang. Erected and engraved in 815, the inscriptions give partial details surrounding the background of a Sogdian Christian community living in Luoyang.

== In popular culture ==
- In the 20th episode of The Longest Day in Chang'an, the Monk Jingde (Volker Helfrich) hands a missionary leaflet to Tan Qi (Rayzha Alimjan), which contains text taken from the inscription of the Xi'an Stele.

== See also ==
- Church of the East in China
- Jingjiao Documents
- Adam (Jingjing)
- Nestorian pillar of Luoyang
- Mogao Christian painting
- Murals from the Christian temple at Qocho
