= Frits Holm =

Danish artefact collector (1881–1930)

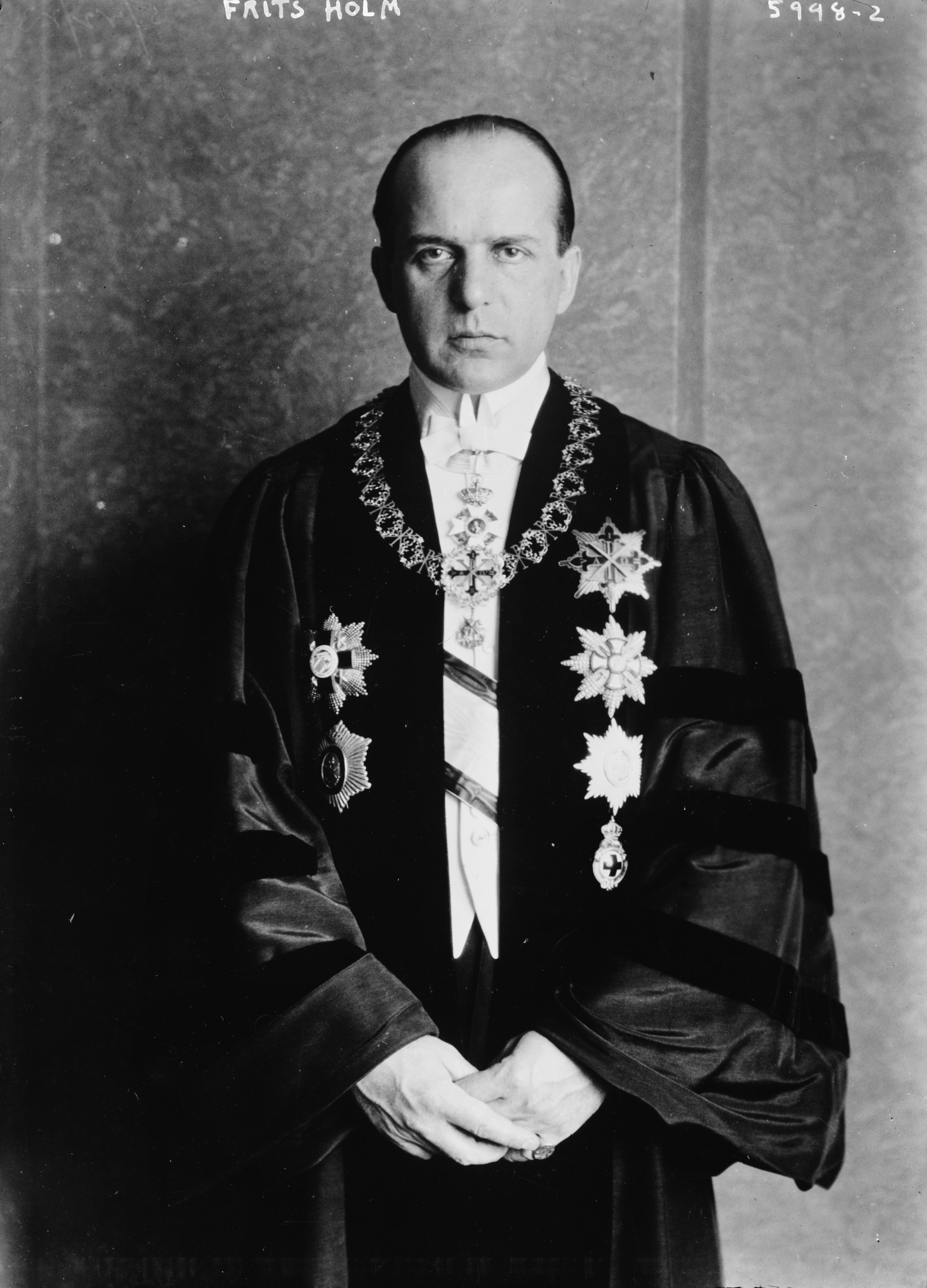
- Holm in 1900
- Born: Frits Vilhelm Holm; 23 July 1881; Charlottenlund, Denmark
- Died: 9 March 1930 (aged 48); New York City, U.S.
- Other names: Fritz von Holm
- Occupation: Journalist
- Spouse: Marguerite MacDonough Green (m. 1919; died 1928)

Frits Vilhelm Holm (23 July 1881 – 9 March 1930) was a Danish journalist, author, phalerist and explorer. His books usually gave his name as simply Frits Holm or Frits V. Holm, while US newspapers of the time usually misspelled his name as Fritz von Holm, sometimes claiming that he was a member of the European nobility.

Holm is best known for his attempt, in 1907, to "obtain" the famous Nestorian Stele, an ancient Christian monument of Xi'an, in Northwestern China, and sell it to a Western museum.

== Nestorian Stele ==
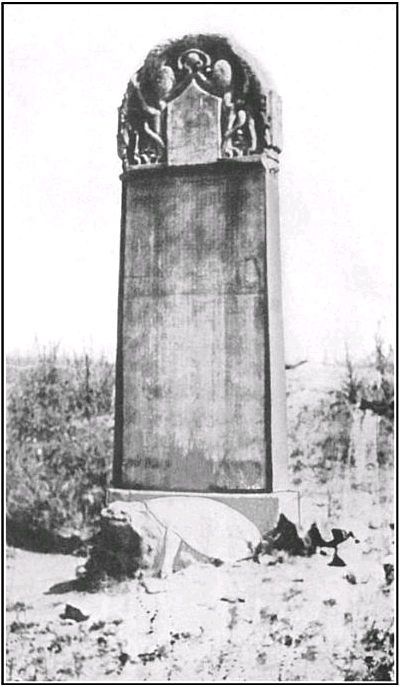
The Nestorian Stele, on its tortoise pedestal, photographed by Frits Holm shortly before it was moved to the Beilin Museum, and out of his reach

Holm came to Xi'an in 1907 planning to take the Nestorian Stele for himself to Europe. Alerted to his activities (nicknamed by later writers the "Holm-Nestorian expedition to Xi'an"), the local authorities moved the monument from its outdoor location on the western outskirts of the city, and into the Stele Forest museum. In order not to leave China empty-handed, the disappointed Holm had an exact copy of the stele made for him in Xi'an. He had the replica stele taken by cart to the Yellow River, then by small boat down the not very navigable Yellow River to the nearest train station at Zhengzhou, and then by train to the major Yangtze River port of Hankou (now in Wuhan).

Instead of London's British Museum, as he supposedly originally intended, Holm had the replica stele shipped to New York, planning to sell it to the Metropolitan Museum of Art. The museum's director Caspar Purdon Clarke, however, was less than enthusiastic about purchasing "so large a stone ... of no artistic value". Nonetheless, the replica stele was exhibited in the museum "on loan" from Holm for about 10 years. Eventually, in 1917, Mrs. George Leary, a wealthy New Yorker, purchased the replica stele and sent it to Rome, as a gift to the Pope. Holm claims that he transported the replica himself, harassed by Austrian submarines on the way.

== Proposal to prevent war ==
Holm published a proposal in the late 1910s and early 1920s which he claimed would end wars.

The following measures shall within ten hours after the beginning of hostilities or the formal declaration of war be carried into effect, to wit: there shall be conscripted as simple soldiers or simple sailors with *rank of privates*, for the earliest possible participation in actual hostilities against the enemy under fire, the following persons:

1. The head of the state, if male, whether president or sovereign.
2. All male blood relatives of the head of the state having attained the age of sixteen.
3. The prime minister and other secretaries of state, as well as all under and assistant secretaries of state.
4. All male representatives elected by the nation for legislative work, except such members as voted openly against said armed conflict.
5. All bishops and prelates, or ecclesiastics of similar rank, of nation's Christian and other churches who failed publicly to oppose such armed conflict.

The above enlistments as privates are for the duration of the war and are enforced in disregard of the individual's age or condition of health, upon which the military medical officers will pass after enlistment.

The wives, daughters and sisters of the above-mentioned persons shall be conscripted as simple nurses or servants for the duration of the war for service only at the front as near actual hostilities under fire as dressing stations or field hospitals are established.

Japanese critic Hasegawa Nyozekan introduced a translation of the bill in the magazine "Warera" (我等), describing it as "certainly a good idea."

== Personal life ==
On 9 October 1919, Holm married Marguerite MacDonough Green in New York. She was the only child of the late Warren L. Green, the president of the American Bank Note Company.

Holm died 9 March 1930 from pneumonia.

== Orders and decorations ==
Holm claimed to have received more than 28 orders and decorations in the period 1902–1920, including:

- Grand Cross of Order of Honour and Merit (Cuba)
- Grand Cross with Swords of Royal Order of Saints Cyril and Methodius
- Knight-Commander Cross of the Order of St. Sylvester
- Grand Officer’s Badge and Star of the Order of the Liberator
- Knight-Commander Cross of the Royal Order of the Redeemer
- Coronation Medal and Royal Red Cross (Spain)
- Cambodgian [sic] Medal of Merit in Gold (France)
