= Church of the East in China =

Eastern Christian church

The Church of the East was a Christian organization with a presence in China during two periods: first from the 7th through the 10th century in the Tang dynasty and secondly during the Yuan dynasty. The Church of the East likely became extinct soon after the emergence of the Ming dynasty in 1368.

After centuries of hiatus, the first Assyrian Church of the East Divine Liturgy was celebrated in China in 2010.

== Name ==
Jingjiao (Chinese: 景教; pinyin: Jǐngjiào; Wade–Giles: Ching^{3}-chiao^{4}; lit. 'Luminous Religion'), is the name in Chinese for Church for the East. The etymology is explained in the Xi'an Stele, "真常之道，妙而難名，功用昭彰，強稱景教。"(lit. 'The way of true and constant reality is wondrous and difficult to name. Its effects and functions are clearly manifest; therefore, we are compelled to designate it—provisionally—as the Luminous Religion.').

And later during the Yuan dynasty in the 13th and 14th centuries, Yelikewen jiao (Chinese: 也里可溫教; pinyin: Yělǐkěwēn jiào) became the name of Christianity.

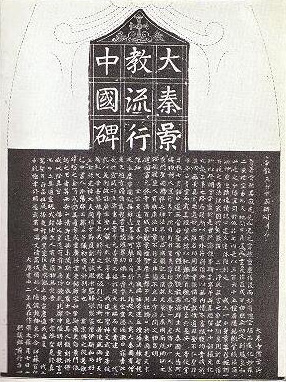
The Xi'an Stele, erected in Chang'an 781.

== Tang dynasty ==
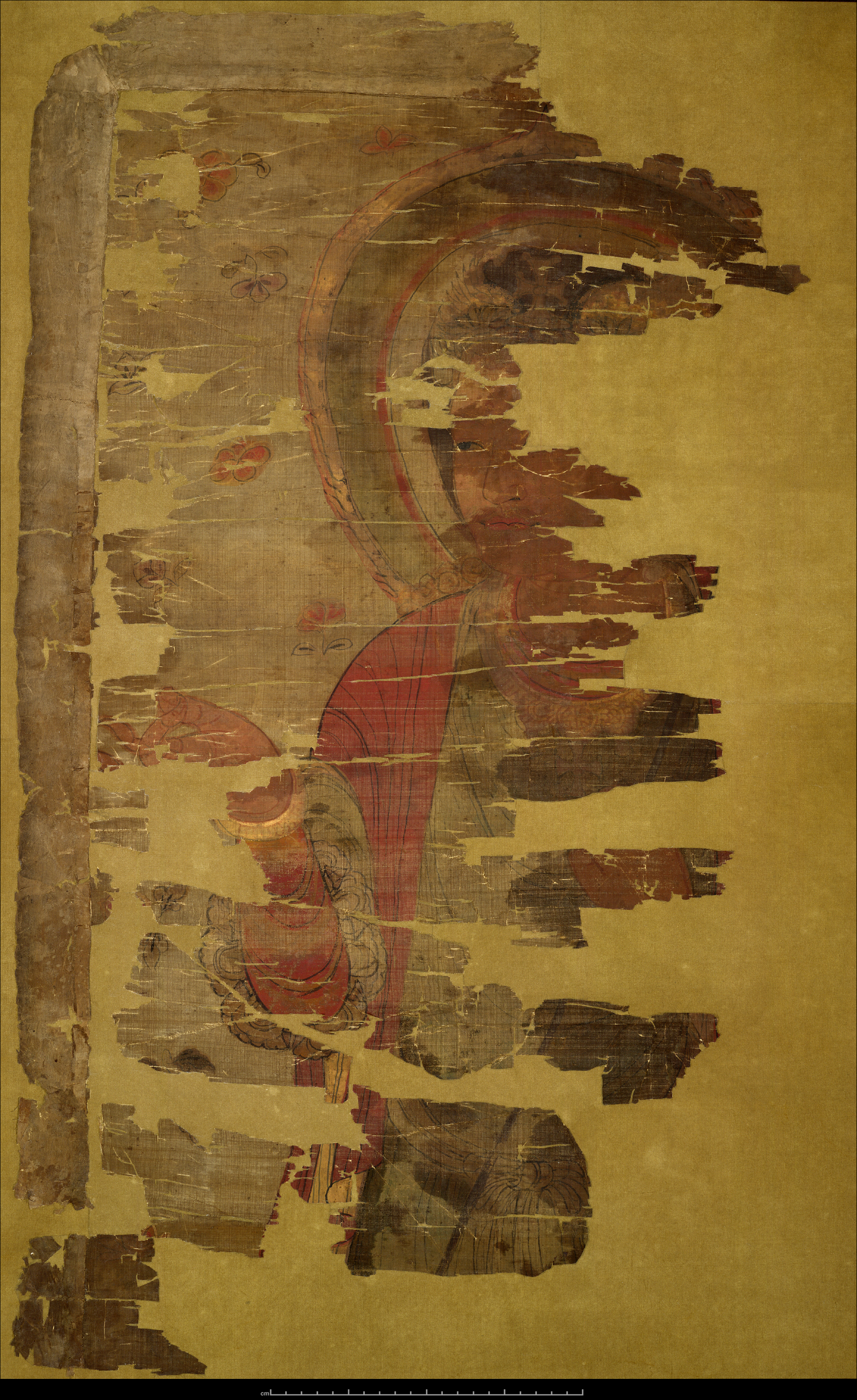
The original work

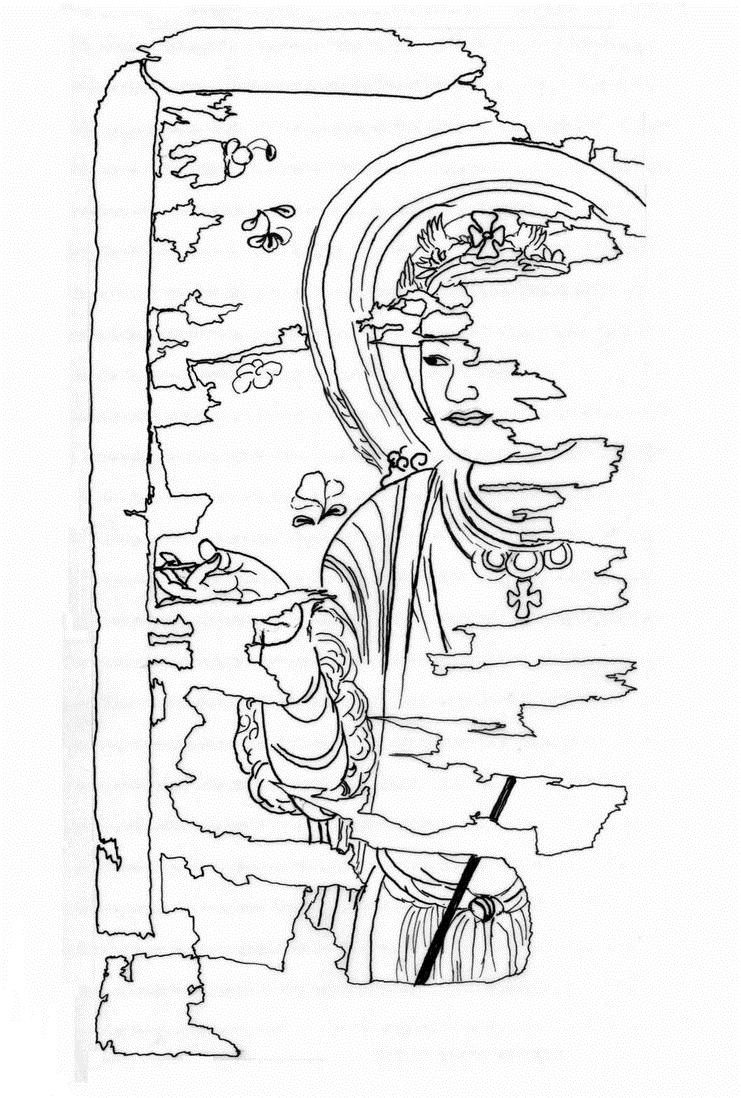
A copy

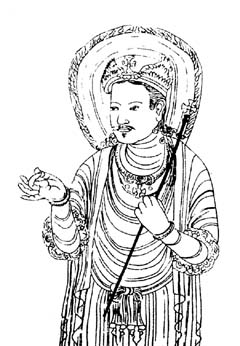
A restoration

A 9th-century fragmentary silk painting of Jesus Christ associated with the Church of the East in China, discovered in Cave 17 at Mogao Caves. It is now kept in the British Museum.

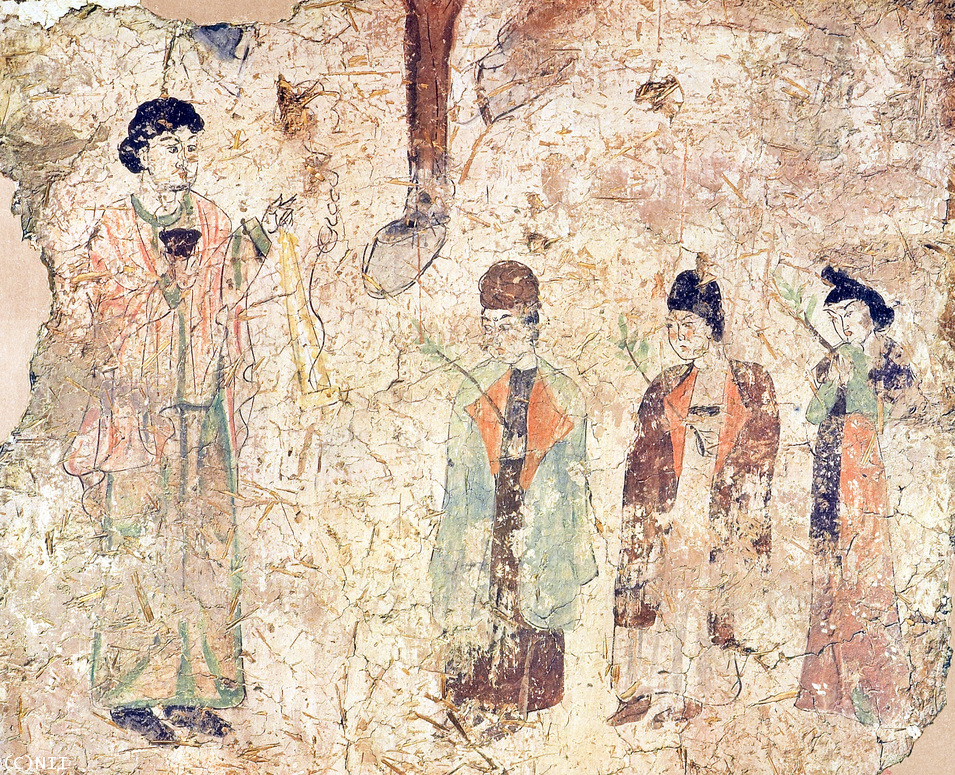
"Procession on Palm Sunday", one of the Tang dynasty murals from the Christian temple at Qocho or Khocho (Museum für Asiatische Kunst Berlin).

=== History ===
Two possibly Church of the East monks were preaching Christianity in India in the 6th century before they smuggled silkworm eggs from China to the Eastern Roman Empire.

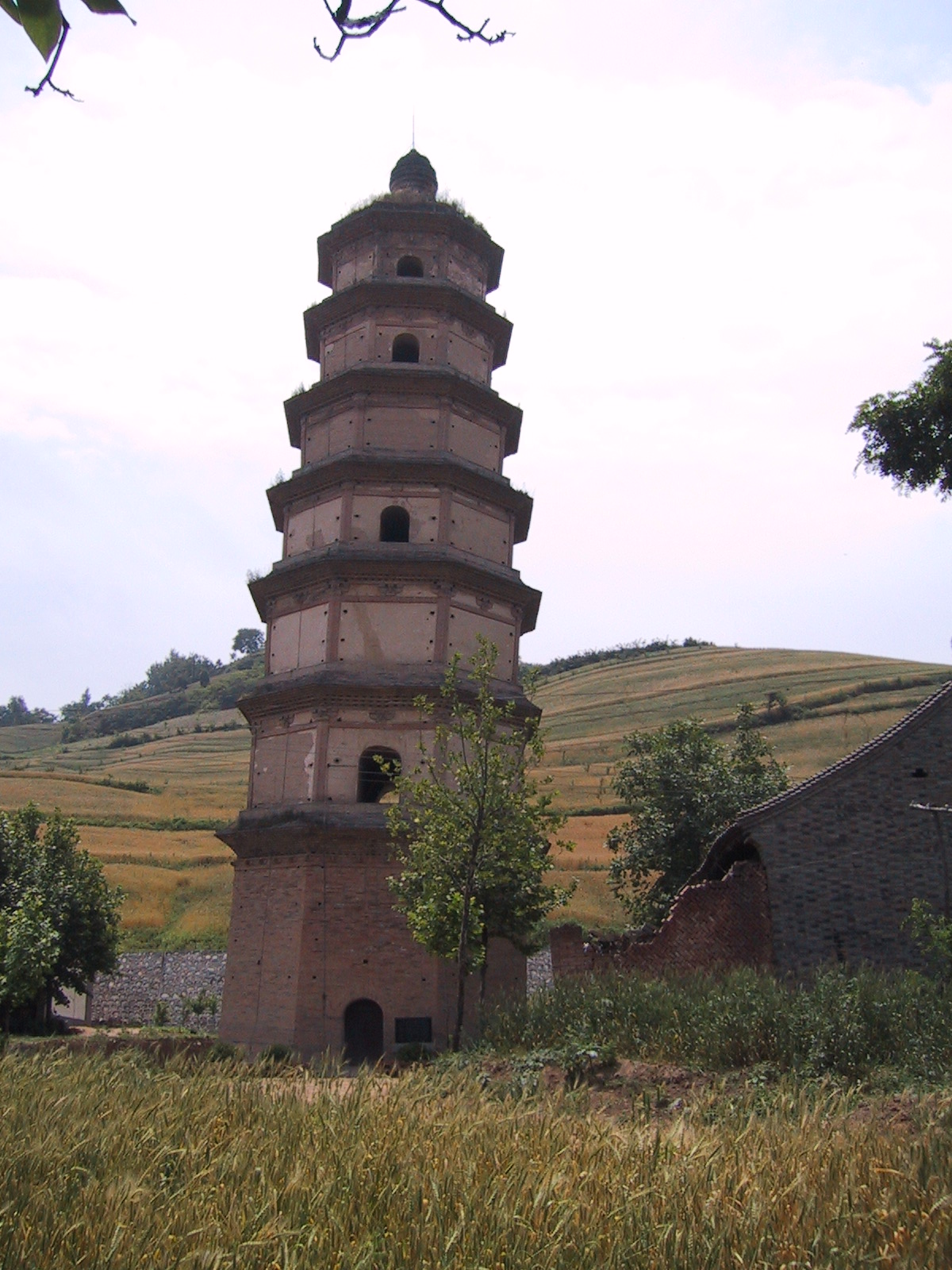
The Daqin Pagoda, part of what some believe to have been an early church in what was then Chang'an, now Xi'an, China, built during the Tang dynasty

The first recorded Christian mission to China was led by the Syriac monk known in Chinese as Alopen. Alopen's mission arrived in the Chinese capital Chang'an in 635, during the reign of Emperor Taizong of the Tang dynasty. Taizong extended official tolerance to the mission and invited the Christians to translate their sacred works for the imperial library. This tolerance was followed by many of Taizong's successors, allowing the Church of the East to thrive in China for over 200 years.

China became a metropolitan province of the Church of the East, under the name Beth Sinaye, in the first quarter of the 8th century. According to the 14th-century writer ʿAbdishoʿ of Nisibis, the province was established by the patriarch Sliba-zkha (714–28). Arguing from its position in the list of exterior provinces, which implied an 8th-century foundation, and on grounds of general historical probability, ʿAbdishoʿ refuted alternative claims that the province of Beth Sinaye had been founded either by the 5th-century patriarch Ahha (410–14) or the 6th-century patriarch Shila (503–23).

Church of the East worshippers in the time of Xuanzong accepted the Confucian religious beliefs of the emperor, and likely other traditional Chinese religions.

In 781 the Christian community in Chang'an erected a tablet known as the Xi'an Stele on the grounds of a local monastery. The stele contains a long inscription in Chinese with Syriac glosses, composed by the cleric Adam, probably the metropolitan of Beth Sinaye. The inscription describes the eventful progress of the Church of the East mission in China since Alopen's arrival. The inscription also mentions the archdeacons Gigoi of Khumdan [Chang'an] and Gabriel of Sarag [Lo-yang]; Yazdbuzid, 'priest and country-bishop of Khumdan'; Sargis, 'priest and country-bishop'; and the bishop Yohannan. These references confirm that the Church of the East in China had a well-developed hierarchy at the end of the 8th century, with bishops in both northern capitals, and there were probably other dioceses besides Chang'an and Lo-yang.

Nestorian Christians like the Bactrian Priest Yisi of Balkh helped the Tang dynasty general Guo Ziyi militarily crush the An Lushan rebellion, with Yisi personally acting as a military commander. Yisi and the Church of the East were rewarded by the Tang dynasty with titles and positions as described in the Xi'an Stele.

It is unlikely that there were many Christian communities in central China, and the only inland Chinese city south of the Yellow River where a Christian presence can be confirmed in the Tang dynasty is Chengdu. And two monasteries have been located in Chengdu and Omei Shan, both in Sichuan. Shortly afterwards Thomas of Marga mentions the monk David of Beth ʿAbe, who was metropolitan of Beth Sinaye during the reign of Timothy I (780–823). Timothy I is said also to have consecrated a metropolitan for Tibet (Beth Tuptaye), a province not again mentioned.

Epitaphs were found dating from the Tang dynasty of a Christian couple in Luoyang of a Nestorian Sogdian woman named Lady An (安氏) who died in 821 and her Nestorian Han Chinese husband, Hua Xian (花献) who died in 827. These Han Chinese Christian men may have married Sogdian Christian women because of a lack of Han Chinese women belonging to the Christian religion, limiting their choice of spouses among the same ethnicity. Another epitaph in Luoyang of a Nestorian Christian Sogdian woman also surnamed An was discovered and she was put in her tomb by her military officer son on 22 January, 815. This Sogdian woman's husband was surnamed He (和) and he was a Han Chinese man and the family was indicated to be multiethnic on the epitaph pillar. In Luoyang, the mixed-race sons of Nestorian Christian Sogdian women and Han Chinese men had many career paths available to them. Neither their mixed ethnicity nor their faith were barriers and they were able to become civil officials or military officers and openly profess their Christian religion and support Christian monasteries.

=== Decline ===
In 845, a decree issued by Emperor Wuzong demanded that foreign religions like Buddhism and Christianity be cast out of the kingdom. The decree required that Christians be forced to return to laity and become taxpayers. The decree had tremendously negative effects on the Christian community and later imperial decrees calling for religious toleration likely had no effect for the Christians, who were likely severely marginalized or extinct by then. By the 10th century, the number of Christians in China declined significantly due to the persecution. Persian traveller Abu Zayd al-Sirafi reported that Christians along with Muslims, Jews and Zoroastrians were killed during the Huang Chao rebellion around 878 or 879.

The province of Beth Sinaye is last mentioned in 987 by the Arab writer Ibn al-Nadim, who met a Nestorian monk who had recently returned from China, who informed him that 'Christianity was just extinct in China; the native Christians had perished in one way or another; the church which they had used had been destroyed; and there was only one Christian left in the land'. The collapse of the Church of the East in China coincided with the fall of the Tang dynasty, which led to a tumultuous era (the Five Dynasties and Ten Kingdoms period).

The eventual extinction of Christianity has been attributed to factors such as that the religion had a minority status and was of foreign character along with dependence on imperial support. The majority of Christians in Tang China were of foreign origin or descent (mostly from Persia and Central Asia). The religion had relatively little impact on the native Han Chinese. Another significant factor to the collapse of the Church of the East was the church's reliance on Tang imperial protection and patronage to continue to operate undisturbed. After the fall of the Tang dynasty, what was left of the church quickly vanished without such support.

=== Literature ===
Dozens of Jingjiao texts were translated from Syriac into Chinese. Only a few have survived. These are generally referred to as the Chinese Jingjiao Documents. One of the surviving texts, the Zunjing or Book of Praise (尊經), lists about 35 books that had been translated into Chinese. Among these books are some translations of the Scriptures, including the Pentateuch (牟世法王經) - Genesis is known as 渾元經, Psalms (多惠聖王經), the Gospels (阿思瞿利容經), Acts of the Apostles (傳化經) and a collection of the Pauline epistles (寳路法王經). These translations of the Scriptures have not survived. However, three non-scriptural Christian books listed in the Zunjing are among the Jingjiao manuscripts that were discovered in the early 20th century: the Sutra on the Origin of Origins, the Sutra of Ultimate and Mysterious Happiness, and the Hymn of Perfection of the Three Majesties (also called Gloria in Excelsis Deo). Two additional Jingjiao manuscripts not listed in the Zunjing have also been discovered: Sutra of Hearing the Messiah and Treatise on the One God.

== Yuan dynasty ==
The Mongols called Church of the East Christians (or Christian priests in particular) Arka′un or Erke′un, which was later applied for Christians in general (including Roman Catholics) whereby Christianity was named in Chinese as 也里可溫教 (Yělǐkěwēn jiào). However, there is a suggestion that the term Yělǐkěwēn jiào might be used also for Míng jiào and some other religions in Jiangnan.

=== History ===
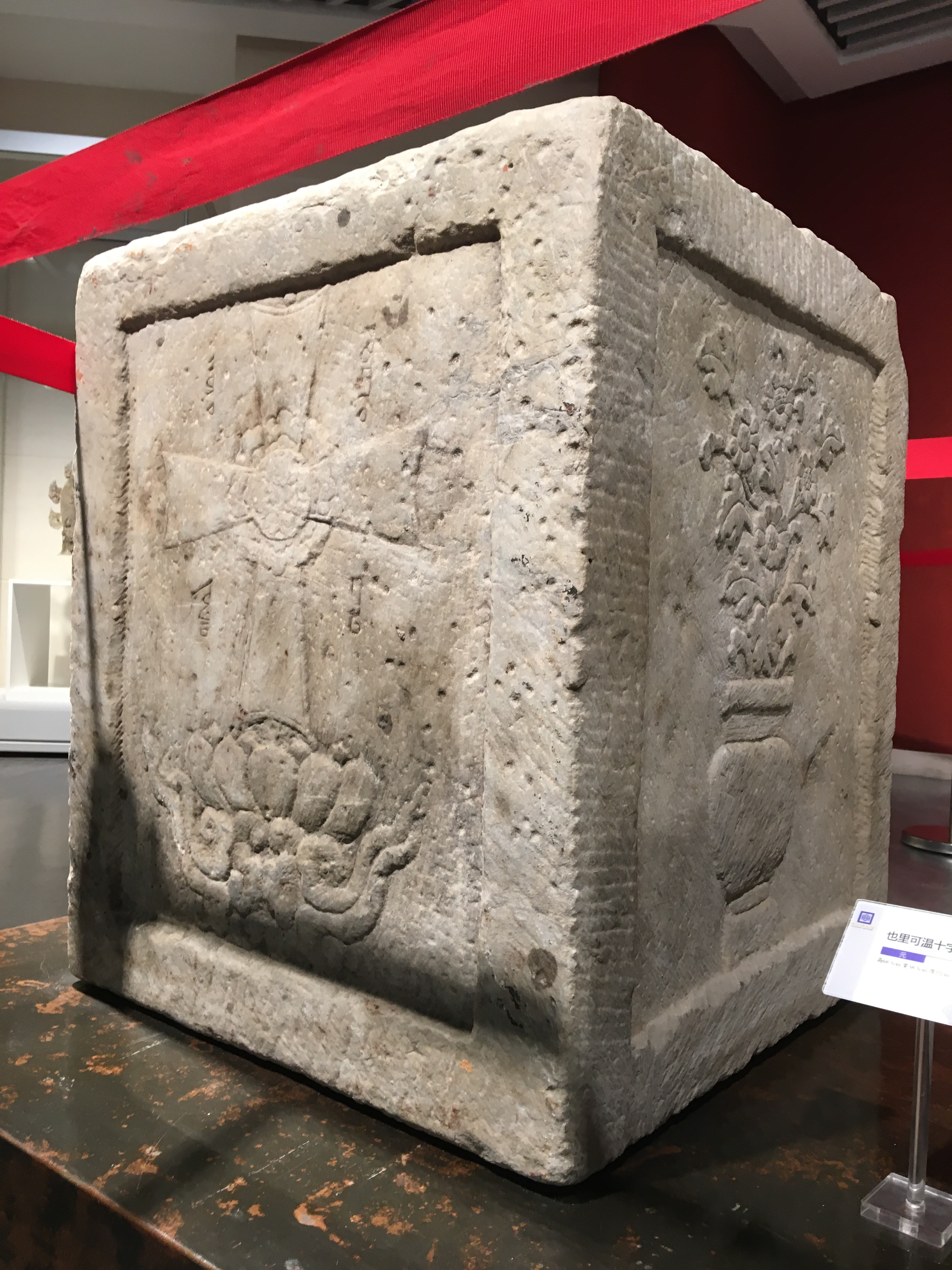
Chinese stone inscription of a Nestorian Cross from the Cross Temple of Fangshan District in Beijing (then called Dadu, or Khanbaliq), dated to the Yuan dynasty (1271-1368 AD) of imperial China.

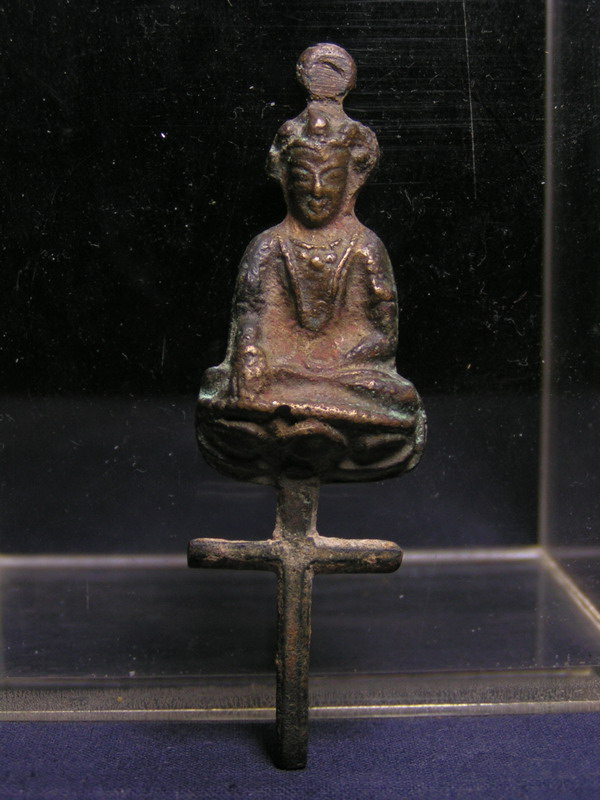
Bodhisattva-like figurine seated on a cross, a Church of the East relic from Imperial China, probably Yuan dynasty.

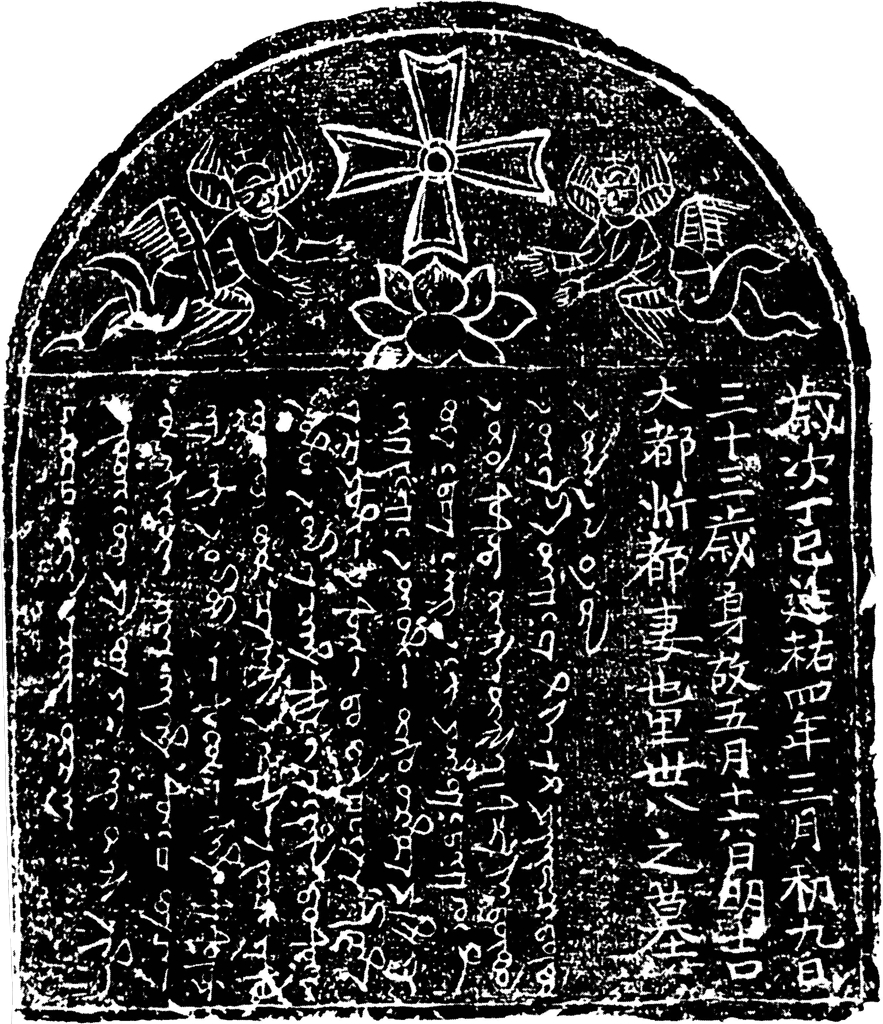
Yuan dynasty Church of the East headstone rubbing, 1317 A.D.

The Church of the East had significant evangelical success under the Mongol Empire. Although both the Abbasid caliphate and General Guo Ziyi fought on the Tang's side during the An Lushan Rebellion, Guo Ziyi's descendants joined the Mongol forces; his direct descendant Guo Kan was instrumental in the Mongol Siege of Baghdad (1258) and the destruction of the Abbasid caliphate which saw the execution of the last Abbasid caliph and the slaughter of 800,000-2,000,000 Arab Muslim civilians in Baghdad, with only the Nestorian Christians being spared.

The rise of the Mongol-led Yuan dynasty in the 13th century allowed the church to return to China, and rise to a greater status than it had ever had before. However, this was primarily among foreigners. By the end of the century, two new metropolitan provinces had been created for China: Tangut and 'Katai and Ong'.

The province of Tangut covered northwestern China, and its metropolitan seems to have sat at Almaliq. The province evidently had several dioceses, even though they cannot now be localised, as the metropolitan Shemʿon Bar Qaligh of Tangut was arrested by the patriarch Denha I shortly before his death in 1281 'together with a number of his bishops'.

The province of Katai (Cathay) and Ong, which seems to have replaced the old Tang dynasty province of Beth Sinaye, covered northern China and the country of the Christian Ongut tribe around the great bend of the Yellow River. The metropolitans of Katai and Ong probably sat at the Yuan capital Khanbaliq. The patriarch Yahballaha III grew up in a monastery in northern China in the 1270s, and the metropolitans Giwargis and Nestoris are mentioned in his biography. Yahballaha himself was consecrated metropolitan of Katai and Ong by the patriarch Denha I shortly before his death in 1281.

During the first half of the 14th century there were Church of the East Christian communities in many cities in China, and the province of Katai and Ong probably had several suffragan dioceses. In 1253 William of Rubruck mentioned a Church of the East bishop in the town of 'Segin' (Xijing, modern Datong in Shanxi province). The tomb of a Church of the East bishop named Shlemun, who died in 1313, has recently been discovered at Quanzhou in Fujian province. Shlemun's epitaph described him as 'administrator of the Christians and Manicheans of Manzi (south China)'. Marco Polo had earlier reported the existence of a Manichean community in Fujian, at first thought to be Christian, and it is not surprising to find this small religious minority represented officially by a Christian bishop.

The relationship between the Catholic Franciscan missionaries and the Church of the East Christians were strained and often in conflict. The Catholics viewed the Church of the East Christians as heretics and rivals while the Church of the East Christians viewed them as political rivals. Roman Catholicism in China was expanded at the expense of the Church of the East during the Yuan dynasty, with some converting to Catholicism.

=== Decline ===
The Church of the East declined in China substantially in the mid-14th century. Several contemporaries, including the papal envoy John of Marignolli, mention the murder of the Latin bishop Richard and six of his companions in 1339 or 1340 by a Muslim mob in Almaliq, the chief city of Tangut, and the forcible conversion of the city's Christians to Islam. The last tombstones in two East Syriac cemeteries discovered in modern-day Mongolia around the end of the 19th century date from 1342, and several commemorate deaths during a plague in 1338. In China, the last references to Nestorian and Latin Christians date from the 1350s, and it is likely that all foreign Christians were expelled from China soon after the collapse of the Yuan dynasty and the rise of the Ming dynasty in 1368. Some scholars have posited that small amounts of Christians among Onguts and Keraites in northern China may have survived into the 15th century but evidence is inconclusive.

Reasons often cited for the rapid decline and disappearance of Church of the East after the fall of the Yuan dynasty include the foreign character of the religion and its adherents, comprising mainly a Central Asian and Turkic-speaking immigrant community. There was also a paucity of native Han Chinese converts, a lack of Chinese translations of the Bible, and a heavy political reliance on patronage by the Yuan imperial court. In consequence of these factors, once the Yuan dynasty fell, the Church of the East in China quickly became marginalized and soon vanished, leaving little trace of its existence.

== Modern China (20th century-present) ==
In 1998, the Assyrian Church of the East sent then-Bishop Mar Gewargis to China. A later visit to Hong Kong led the Assyrian Church to state that: "after 600 years, the Eucharistic Liturgy, according to the anaphora of Mar Addai & Mari was celebrated at the Lutheran Theological Seminary chapel on Wednesday evening, October 6, 2010." This visit was followed up two years later at the invitation of the Jǐngjiào Fellowship with Mar Awa Royel accompanied by Reverend and Deacon, arriving in Xi'an, China in October 2012. On Saturday October 27, the Holy Eucharist in the Aramaic language was celebrated by Mar Awa, assisted by Fr. Genard and Deacon Allen in one of the churches in the city.

== See also ==
- Xi'an Stele
- Daqin Pagoda
- Jingjiao Documents
- Rabban Bar Sauma
- Yahballaha III
- Ongud
- Keraites
- Church of the East in Sichuan
- Mogao Christian painting
- Murals from the Christian temple at Qocho
- Christianity among the Mongols
- Chinese Manichaeism
