= Alopen =

First Christian missionary to China

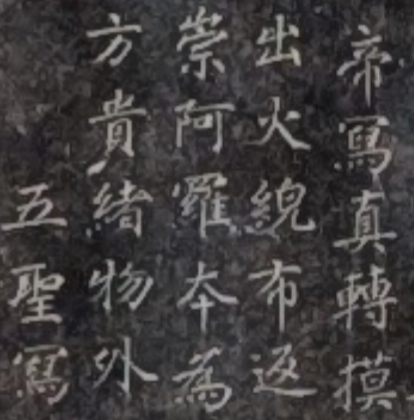
- The name "Alopen" (阿羅本) in the Xi'an Stele.
- Traditional Chinese: 阿羅本
- Simplified Chinese: 阿罗本
Transcriptions
Standard Mandarin
- Hanyu Pinyin: Āluóběn
- IPA: [á.lwǒ.pə̀n]
Middle Chinese
- Middle Chinese: alapuən^{X}

Alopen (Chinese: 阿羅本; fl. AD 635; also rendered A-lo-pen, Aleben, Aluoben, Olopen, Olopan, or Olopuen) was a 7th-century Church of the East monk and missionary and the first recorded Christian missionary to have reached China during the Tang dynasty. He is described as a Persian Christian monk and was probably a Syriac speaker from either the Sasanian Empire or Byzantine Syria.

Alopen is known exclusively from the Xi'an Stele, discovered by Jesuits in 1625, which records his arrival at the Tang capital of Chang'an in 635 and his acceptance by Emperor Taizong (r. 627–650). According to the stele, the emperor granted Alopen and sixty-seven others permission to work as missionaries in Sian-fu. His is the earliest known name associated with the history of the Church of the East in China. The missions subsequently established an extensive Christian church in China, which was eventually brought to an end by Ming persecutions.

== History ==
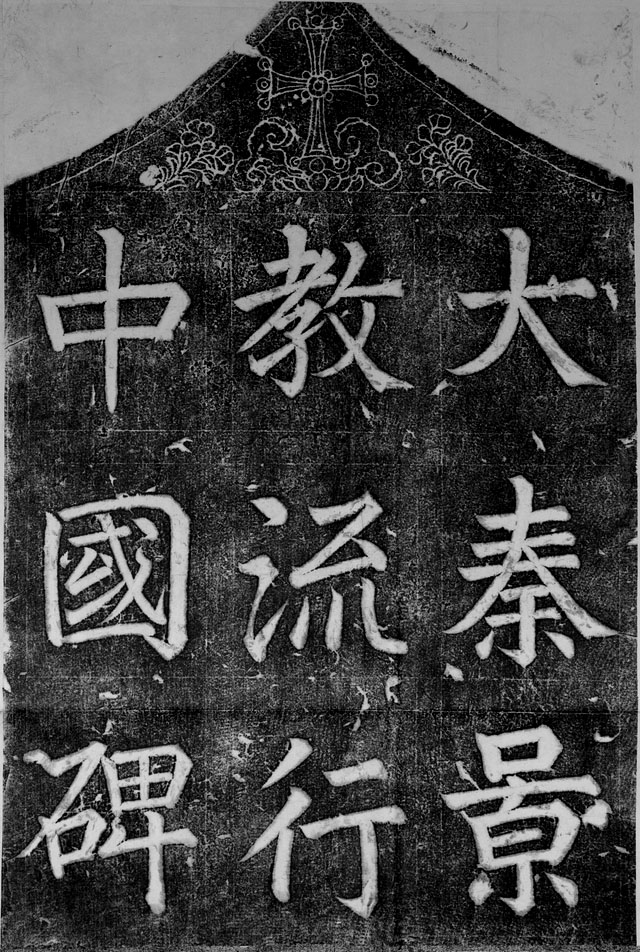
Detail of the Xi'an Stele artifact, mentioning Alopen

Alopen's name is known only from the Chinese of the Xi'an Stele. This may be a transliteration of the Semitic "Abraham" or aloho punoya, "the conversion of God." Amy Chua posits that his name could be a transcription of "Ruben", Alexis Balmont rather advocates for Ardaban.

According to the Stele, Alopen and his fellow missionaries came to China from Daqin (or Ta Tsin – the Byzantine Empire) in the ninth year of Emperor Taizong (Tai Tsung; 635), bringing sacred books and images. He would have come to China via the Silk Road. The Church of the East mission benefited from Taizong's policy of religious tolerance, which reversed measures his father Gaozu had taken against Buddhism and other foreign religions and influences. Many of the religions that were tolerated entered through the Silk Road: Zoroastrianism, Manichaeism, Judaism, Islam, and Christianity. Taizong appreciated Jesus as another sage, and Christian doctrines as being profound and promoting peace, and therefore welcome to be preached throughout the Empire.

太宗文皇帝，光華啓運，明聖臨人，大秦國有上徳曰阿羅本，占青雲而載真經，望風律以馳艱險。貞觀九祀，至扵長安。
In the time of the accomplished Emperor Taitsung, the illustrious and magnificent founder of the dynasty, among the enlightened and holy men who arrived was the Most-virtuous Olopun, from the country of Syria. Observing the azure clouds, he bore the true sacred books; beholding the direction of the winds, he braved difficulties and dangers. In the year AD 635 he arrived at Chang-an.

— Extract from the Xi'an Stele, about the arrival of Alopen.

According to the Stele, Taizong welcomed Alopen and arranged for the translation of the holy writings he had brought with him at the Imperial Library. Upon studying them, Taizong, a great scholar and patron, found them most acceptable and arranged for their dissemination. Indeed, four documents from the early period of Christianity in China date to around Alopen's time. Three years later, in 638, Taizong issued an official declaration protecting the Church of the East. He erected China's first Christian church and recognized twenty-one priests, likely all Persians, to administer it. Under Taizong's son and successor Gaozong, who continued this policy of toleration, Alopen's status expanded even further, and he was appointed bishop over the many churches built by the emperor.

After Alopen's time, the Church of the East was prominent in China for the remainder of the Tang Dynasty's power. Different emperors treated it differently, with some showing it the tolerance it received in the early decades, and some openly persecuting it. The Church of the East disappeared with the fall of the Tang Dynasty in the early 10th century. It did not return for three centuries, when it was reintroduced by the Mongols. The story of Alopen became prominent again in the 17th century, when the Xi'an Stele was rediscovered and the Chinese were surprised to find that the "new" religion being preached by the missionaries, had actually been in existence in China more than 1,000 years earlier.

== See also ==
- Adam (monk)
