= Adam (monk) =

Christian monk

Adam / Jingjing
- ܐܕܡ / 景淨
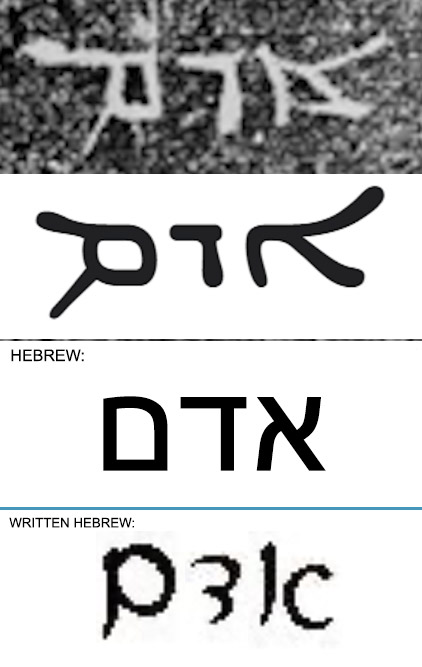
- "Adam" in Syriac in the Xian Nestorian Stele, in Hebrew and in Written Hebrew (reads from right to left)

Personal life
- Born: 750/751 CE China
- Died: , but after 781 CE China
- Flourished: 8th century CE
- Occupation: Deacon

Religious life
- Religion: Christianity
- School: Nestorianism

Adam (Syriac: ܐܕܡ Adam), also known by his Chinese name Jingjing (Chinese: 景淨; pinyin: Jǐngjìng; Wade–Giles: Ching^{3}-ching^{4}), was an 8th-century Syriac Christian monk and scholar in China. He composed the text on the Nestorian Stele, which described the history of the Church of the East in China from 635 to 781. Many scholars believe he is also the author of the later Jingjiao Documents.

== Biography ==
Scholars place Adam's probable birth at around 750 or 751. Adam's father was named Yazedbozid (Syriac: ܝܙܕܒܘܙܝܕ Yazedbuzid, Chinese: 伊斯; Yīsī), who was part of a fighting unit invited to come to China by the Tang court to help quell the An Lushan Rebellion. According to the Syriac text on the stele, Adam's grandfather was named Mailas (ܡܝܠܝܣ Milis), and was a priest from Balkh (ܒܠܟ݂ Balkh) in Tokharistan (ܬܟ݂ܘܪܝܣܬܢ Takhouristan), in northern Afghanistan. It has been posited that Adam was raised or born in China and received a Chinese education due to his grasp of Classical Chinese and Chinese religious thought that's observed in his writings.

=== Nestorian stele ===
Around 781, Adam composed the text of the Nestorian Stele. Sources also state that Adam translated (by imperial order) multiple Biblical texts into Chinese. The texts in question seemed to be paraphrases of certain portions of the New Testament and to a smaller extent, parts of the Old Testament. In 786, Adam helped a Buddhist monk from Kapisha called Prajna translate the Buddhist text Sutra of the Six Mahayana Paramitas from an Iranian language (Sogdian or Bactrian) to Chinese. The translated text was presented to Emperor Dezong in 787, who rejected the translation on the grounds it was faulty, corrupted, and confused by a fusion of Buddhist and Nestorian concepts.

Adam was bilingual in Persian and Chinese. He may also have been literate in Syriac, Arabic and possibly Sogdian or Bactrian.

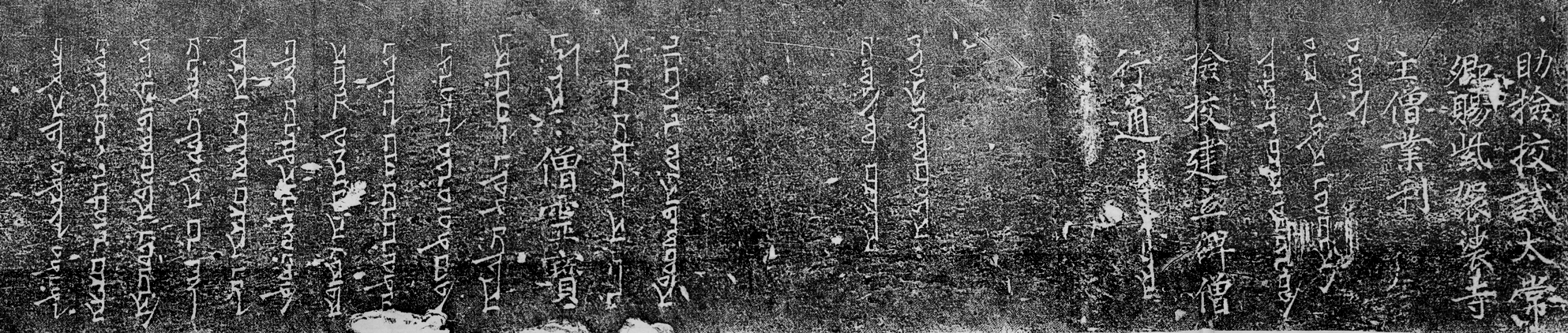
Jingjing/Adam is mentioned several times in the Nestorian Stele of Xi'an: "In the year of the Greeks one thousand and ninety-two, the Lord Jazedbuzid, Priest and Vicar-episcopal of Cumdan the royal city, son of the enlightened Mailas, Priest of Balach a city of Turkestan, set up this tablet, whereon is inscribed the Dispensation of our Redeemer, and the preaching of the apostolic missionaries to the King of China. ["The Priest Lingpau", in Chinese] "Adam the Deacon, son of Jazedbuzid, Vicar-episcopal. The Lord Sergius, Priest and Vicar-episcopal. Sabar Jesus, Priest. Gabriel, priest, Archdeacon, and Ecclesiarch of Cumdan and Sarag."

== Bibliography ==
- Godwin, R. Todd (2018). Persian Christians at the Chinese Court: The Xi'an Stele and the Early Medieval Church of the East. Bloomsbury Publishing. ISBN 978-1-78673-316-0.
