= Three Persian religions =

Iranian religions that spread to Tang-era China

Three Persian religions
唐代三夷教

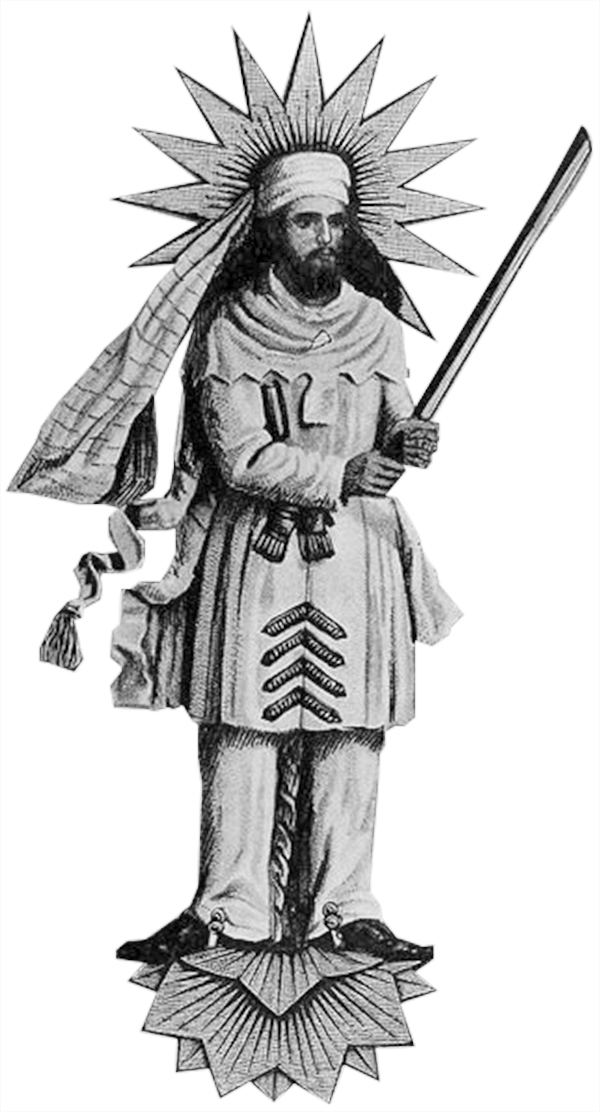
Iranian prophet Zarathushtra, the founder of Zoroastrianism

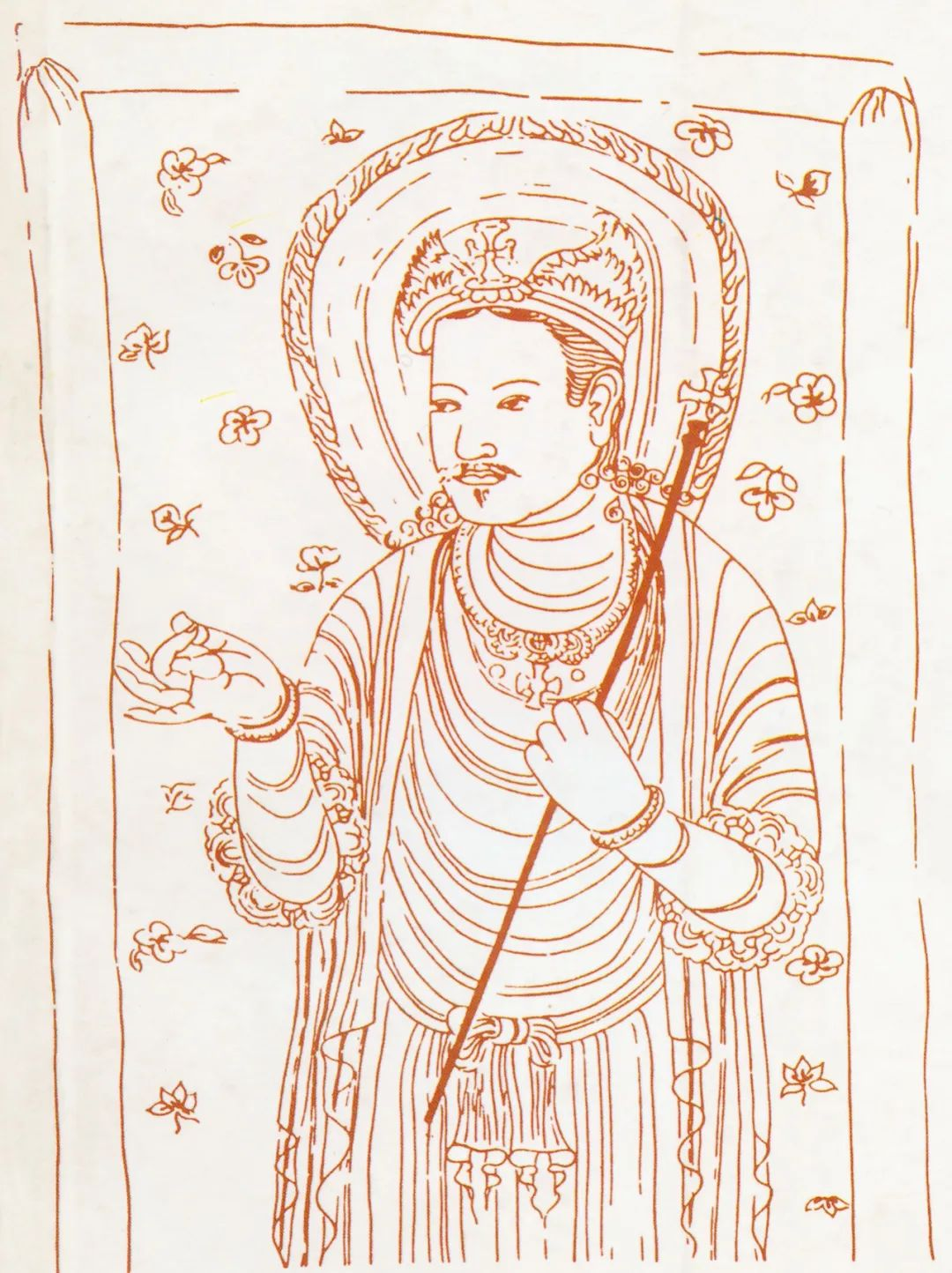
Painting of a Christian figure, dated to the 9th century, associated with the Persian Church in China during the Tang dynasty

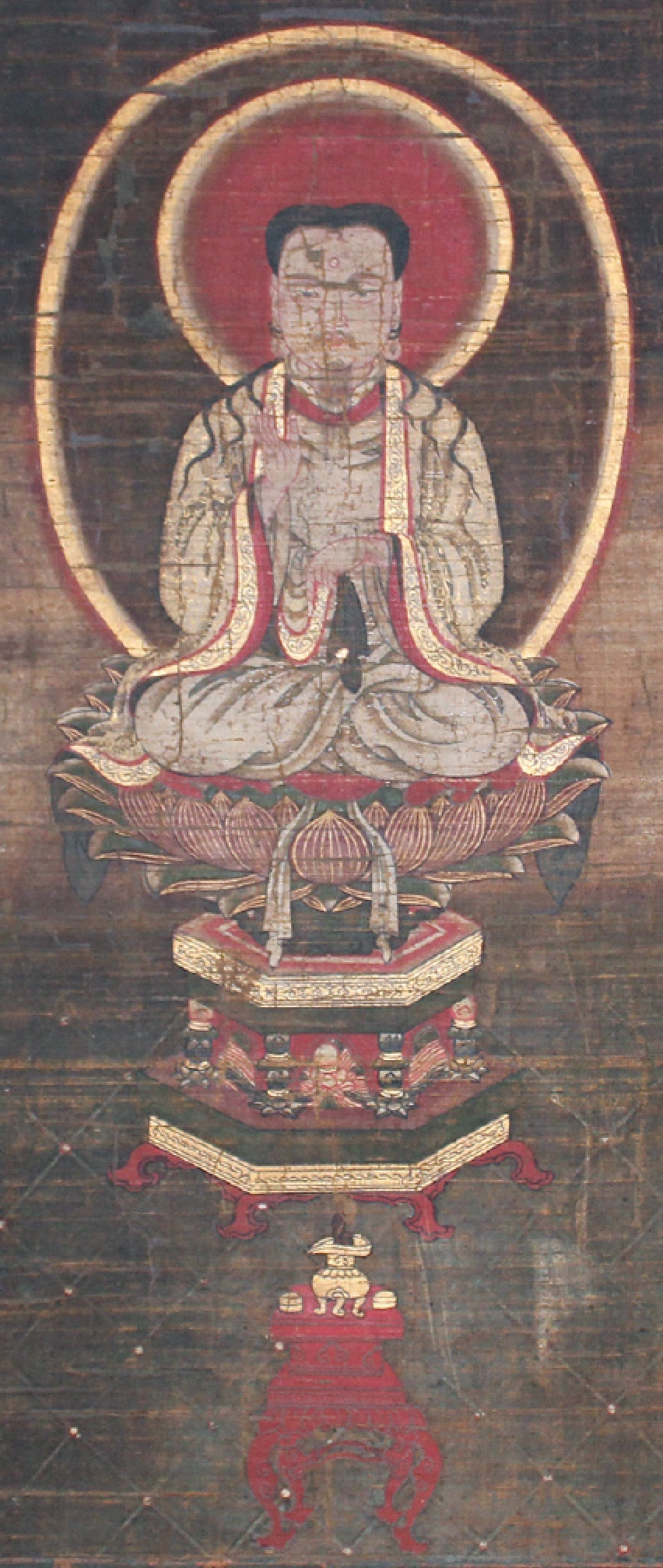
Sermon on Mani's Teaching of Salvation, dated to the 13th century, associated with Manichaeism in China during the Yuan dynasty

The three Persian religions (Chinese: 唐代三夷教; pinyin: Táng-dài sān yí jiào; lit. 'Three Foreign Religions of the Tang Dynasty'), as a medieval Chinese concept, referred to a group of Iranian religions that spread to Tang China. They were recognized and protected under Tang rule, helping them to prosper in China at a time when Sassanid Iran was falling to the early Muslim conquests. The three religious movements identified by the term were Zoroastrianism, the Church of the East, and Manichaeism.

== Background ==
The "three Persian religions" include:

- Zoroastrianism (xiān-jiào 祆教)
- The Christian Church of the East (jǐng-jiào 景教)
- Manichaeism (míng-jiào 明教)

Zoroastrianism was first introduced to China during the early Northern and Southern dynasties period, while Christianity and Manichaeism were both introduced to the Central Plains during the Tang dynasty. The second Tang emperor, Emperor Taizong, led an attack on the King of Gaochang, Koji Wentai, in the 13th year of the Zhenguan era (639). Thereafter, the Tang Dynasty prospered until the Kaiyuan era of Emperor Xuanzong, during which the government's tolerance of religion facilitated the spread of different cultures. The Tang capital of Chang'an, with a population of more than one million, was particularly cosmopolitan, as the city was strongly influenced by foreign cultures. Indian illusionists, Persian dancers, singers, musicians, harem girls, and exotic cuisine could be found in the streets, and polo was a popular activity at the court, where noble women also enjoyed horseback riding. The Tang dynasty's cosmopolitanism therefore facilitated spread of the three Persian religions.

The three Persian religions were persecuted in the 9th century during the Huichang Persecution of Buddhism, which led to their gradual decline. However, their influence was still strong in certain periods of Chinese history. In particular, Manichaeism was transferred to the folk secrets in the later period, blending with Buddhism, Taoism, and folk beliefs. The Xiapu Manuscript of Fujian Province, discovered in 2008, was probably written during the Ming dynasty. In the modern day, there are special masters in Xiapu County who keep these Ming-style books on mantras and religious rituals. Thus, Xiapu Manichaeanism has been transformed into a Chinese folk belief.

== Overview ==
=== Zoroastrianism ===
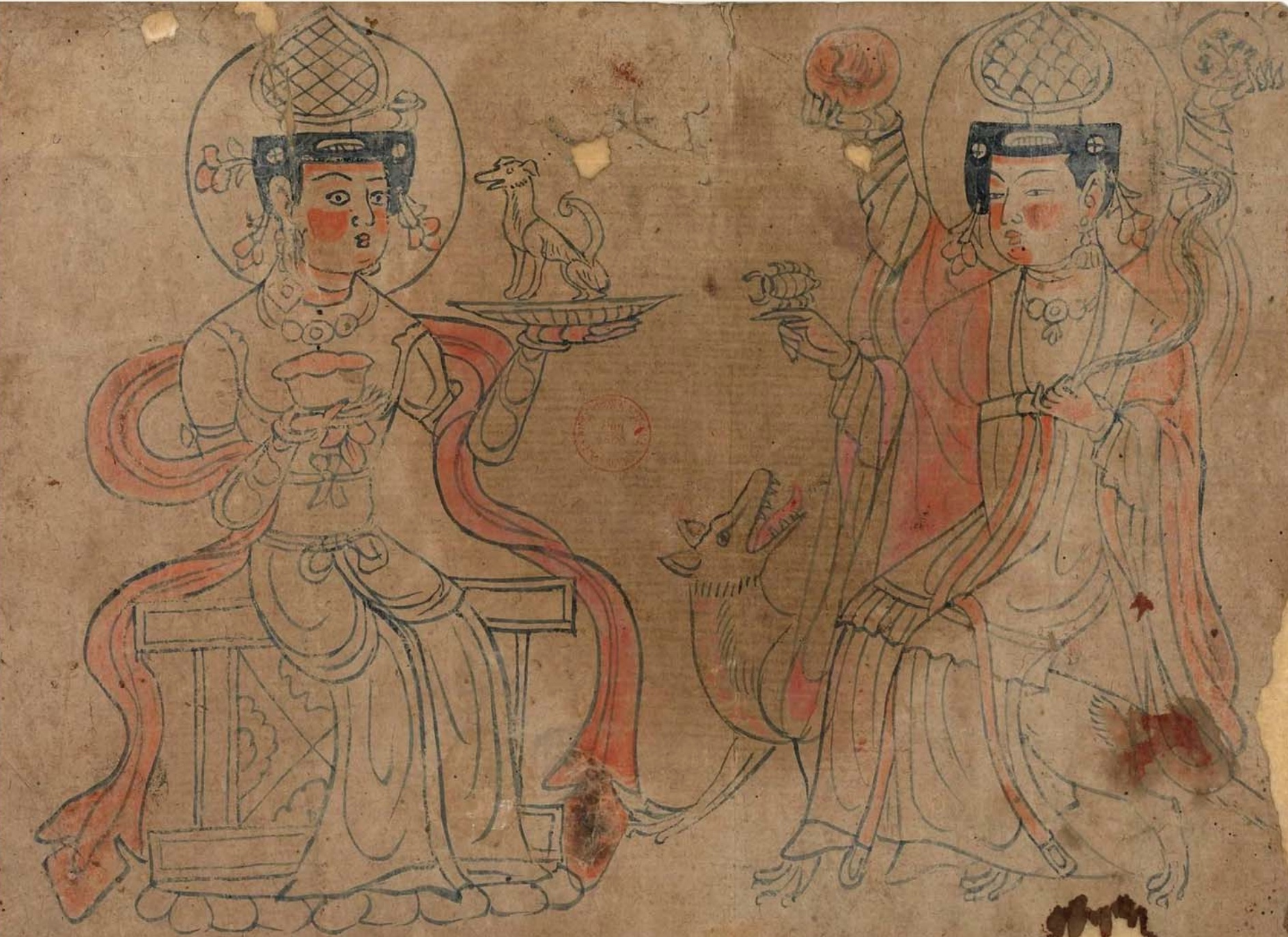
The 10th century painting "Sogdian Daēnās", from Dunhuang, is a paper idol used in the Zoroastrian religion.

Zoroastrianism, which originated in modern-day Iran, was the state religion of the Achaemenid Empire and the Sassanid Empire. In his book The Introduction of Fire Zoroastrianism to China, Chen Yuan argues that Zoroastrianism was first introduced to China during the Southern Liang period of the Northern Wei dynasty in the early 6th century A.D. Hu Tian, the god worshipped by Empress Ling of Northern Wei, was Ahura Mazda, the supreme god of Zoroastrianism. Lin Wush believes that Zoroastrianism was introduced to China in the middle of the 5th century, while Rong Xinjiang, after examining various documents, believes that it was introduced to China in the early 4th century.

Unlike some other religions, which generally call their places of worship "temples", Zoroastrianism calls its places of worship "fire temples". Zoroastrianism also differs from other religions in that its followers did not preach in China, nor did they translate scriptures, so only the Hu people, not the Han Chinese, practiced it. According an unearthed epitaph written in Sogdian, a "Sabao" official position existed during the Sui and Tang dynasties. These Sabao served Sogdian Zoroastrians, specializing in the management of the Western Hu people living in the Central Plains and their religious activities. This position was especially prevalent amongst the Hua Sogdians. During the Tang dynasty, there was a competition held by Sogdians in Dunhuang. During the Huichang persecution of Buddhism in the mid-800s under Emperor Wuzong of Tang, Zoroastrianism was also targeted, eventually disappearing in China after the fall of the Song dynasty in 1279. In modern-day China, Zoroastrian art is primarily unearthed from Sogdian Tombs.

=== Christianity ===
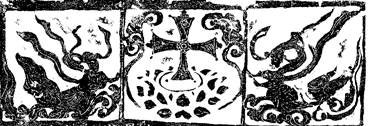
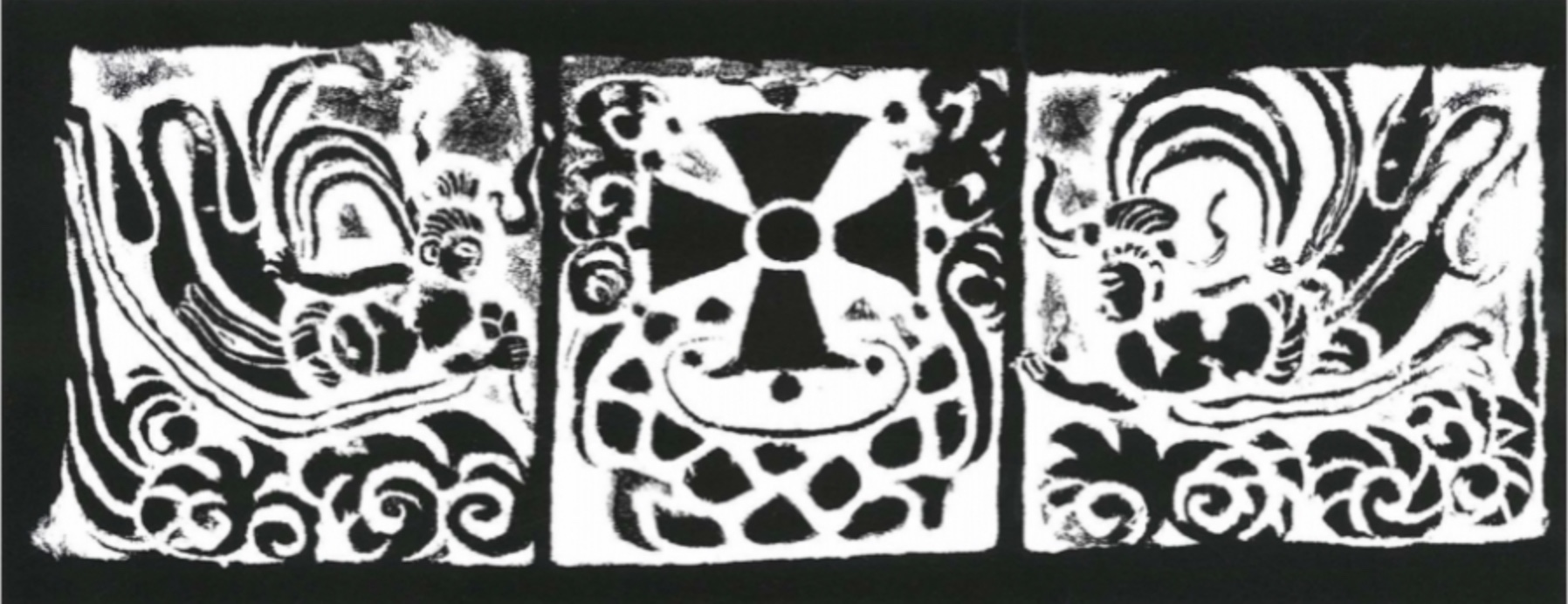
Rubbings of the Nestorian Cross and the flying pattern on the Tang Dynasty Nestorian pillar of Luoyang

The Church of the East in China was called the Great Qin Church and the Persian Scripture Church when it first entered the Tang dynasty because its seat was located in the Sassanid Empire. The church would later be known as Jingjiao. According to the Daqin Jinghuism Popular China Tablet, in the ninth year of Emperor Taizong of Tang's reign (635), a great deity of Daqin, Alopen, came to Chang'an, the capital of the Tang dynasty, with a statue of the scriptures. Emperor Taizong sent his chancellor, Fang Xuanling, to the western suburbs to welcome the guest inside. After examining the teachings, Emperor Taizong ordered the construction of a Daqin temple in Yiningfang, which would come to be known as the Jingjiao temple, and began the translation of the scriptures with the help of Fang Xuanling and Wei Zheng. Thereafter, Jingism developed smoothly in China for 150 years, and at one time, "the Dharma flowed through ten provinces and the temples filled a hundred cities". According to the Dzogchen, the Persian monk Jingjing translated 35 Jing sutras into Chinese in the 8th century AD. It was not until Emperor Wu Zong of the Tang Dynasty initiated the persecution of Buddhism in Huichang that the Jing religion fell victim and declined rapidly. The second major expansion of the religion into China was not until after the establishment of the Yuan Dynasty, but it died out again during the Ming Dynasty. There are few artworks of the Jing religion left behind, but there are now paintings of Christ in the Zangjing cave and murals in the Jing temple in Gaochang. In addition, there are tombstones with engravings and decorations by Christians, and bronze medallions (bronze crosses and other shaped robes and decorations).

=== Manichaeism ===
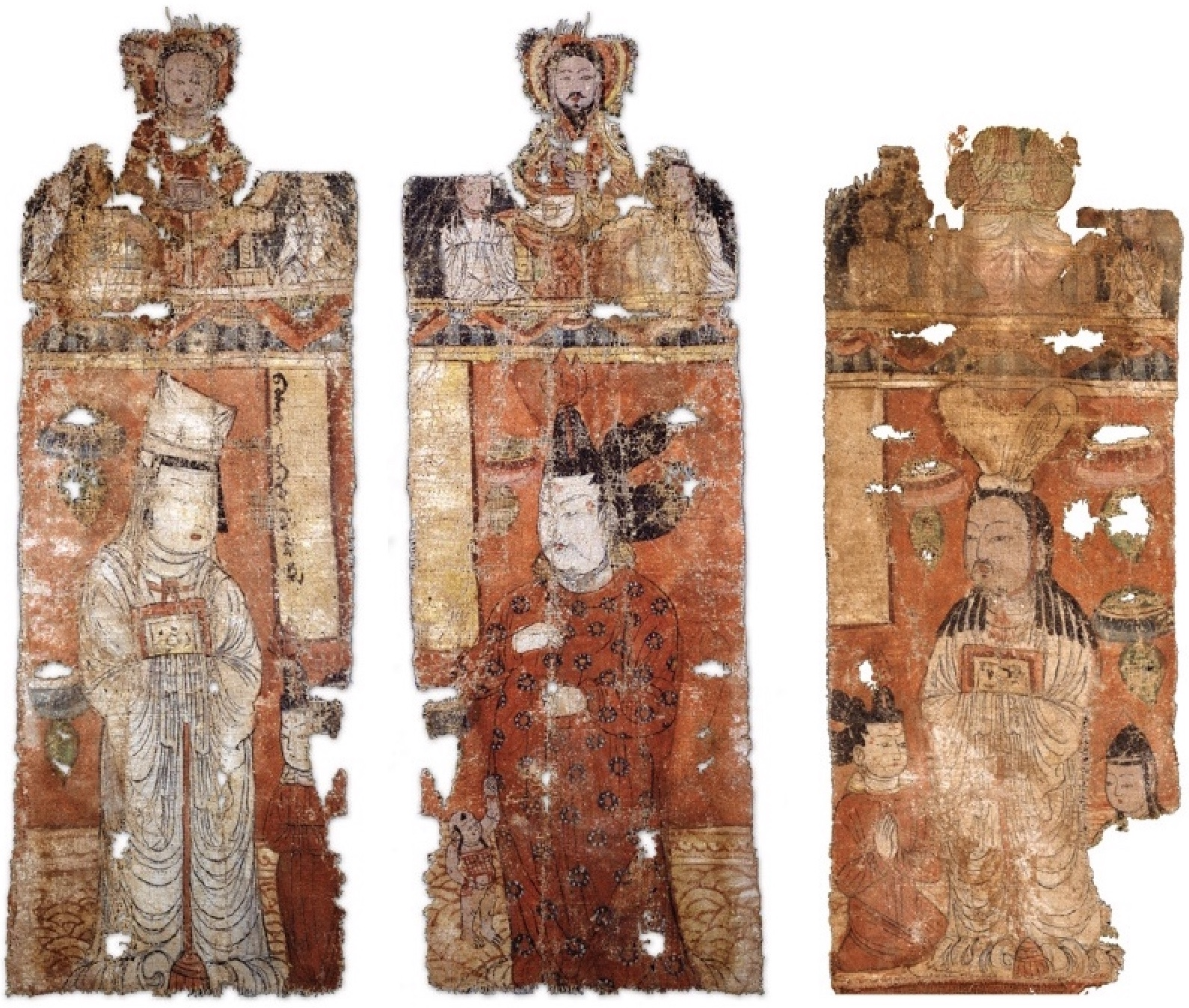
10th century Gaochang Manichaean painted banners "MIK III 6286" and "MIK III 6283", the top is painted with the bright virgin and the seated statue of Jesus, and the lower part is the statue of the Manichean elect.

Manichaeism is a Gnostic religion that originated in the territory of Sassanian Empire. It was created by the Persian Mani in the 3rd century AD and has always been regarded as a door of Christian heresy According to "The Buddhist history", In the first year of Wu Zetian's reign (694), the Persian Fudodan came to the dynasty with Manichean scriptures. The status of women in Manichaeism is very high, and Wu Zetian may have a good impression of them and treat Manichaeism preferentially. Later, the translated book "Manichaean Compendium" was banned by Emperor Xuanzong of Tang Dynasty because it borrowed a lot of Buddhist terminology and was judged to be "an evil opinion and a false claim of Buddhism that could confuse the people. After the An Lushan Rebellion, Uyghur Khanate established Manichaeism as the state religion. Relying on the political strength of the Uighurs, the religion began to spread widely in the Central Plains, and a Manichaean monastery, the Great Cloud Temple of Light, was established. It was not until the persecution of Buddhism by Emperor Wuzong of the Tang Dynasty in Huichang that Manichaeism was also banned. The religion then moved to the coastal areas of southern China, such as Fujian and Zhejiang, where it was secretly spread among the people and gradually combined with other religions, and remained intact through the Five Dynasties, Song and Yuan. After the Song Dynasty, the religion was renamed Mingism, and was denounced by the rulers of the time as a "vegetable-eating devil". "The reason for this is that Manichaeism rejects meat and vegetables, but its followers do not eat only vegetables; for them, fruits and vegetables are the most desirable food. The term "serving the devil" is a derogatory term used by those who are hostile to Manichaeism, saying that it serves demons. But in fact, the practice of Manichaeism is very strict. In addition to insisting on vegetarianism, Chen Yuan also pointed out that "Manichaeism is extremely strict with itself, extremely forgiving with others, extremely disciplined with itself, extremely fair with money, and no less than a moral religion. Thus, the religion was quite popular among the people". Manichaeism also attaches great importance to the juxtaposition of scriptures and pictures In the way of missions, the leader Mani not only wrote Seven Canons, but also drew Arzhang by himself. Manichaean artwork, such as manuscript illustrations, painted streamers, wall paintings, and silk scrolls, are brightly colored, gorgeous and dazzling.

== Supplement ==
In addition to the Persian religions, Islam also spread to China during the Tang Dynasty. Many Muslim merchants from Iran and Central Asia settled in China during this period. According to Chinese Muslim tradition, Muhammad's uncle Sa'd ibn Abi Waqqas was sent to China to meet Tang Gaozong, located in Guangzhou Tang Dynasty The construction of Huaisheng Mosque is related to him.

== See also ==
Zoroastrianism-related articles

- Xianshenlou
- Sogdian Daēnās

Christianity-related articles

- Mogao Christian painting
- Murals from the Christian temple at Qocho
- Nestorian cross

Manichaeism-related articles

- Manichaean art
- Cao'an Manichaean Temple
