= Ancient Arts of Central Asia =

1965 book by Tamara Talbot Rice

- First paperback edition
- Author: Tamara Talbot Rice
- Cover artist: Uyghur Princesses by unknown artist, mural from Bezeklik Caves.
- Language: English
- Series: The World of Art Library
- Subject: Central Asian art
- Genre: non-fiction monograph
- Publisher: Thames & Hudson
- Publication date: 1965
- Publication place: United Kingdom
- Media type: Print (hardback and paperback)
- Pages: 288 pp.
- ISBN: 978-0-500-20030-8 (first hardcover edition)

Ancient Arts of Central Asia is a 1965 illustrated monograph by Russian-born English art historian Tamara Talbot Rice, published by Thames & Hudson as part of their 'World of Art Library' series.

== Synopsis ==
Under the name of Central Asia, Tamara Talbot Rice covers in the book a vast region in the broader interpretation of the term, from Transcaucasia to Eastern Turkestan, and a period spanning from prehistoric times to the Middle Ages when Christianity and Islam replaced Buddhism and Zoroastrianism.

Starting with the early animal art of the Scythians in Southern Russia, the author proceeds eastwards, through Urartu and Persian-influenced region (Marlik and Ziwieh), Sogdia and Chorasmia, Hellenistic Bactria to Indo-Greek art, revealing the Graeco-Buddhist sculpture of Gandhara and the more Indian-natured School of Mathura. In the fifth chapter, Rice examines the little-known paintings and other forms of art of Eastern Turkestan, including Buddhist art of Bezeklik, Kizil, Khotan and Tunhuang, Indo-Sassanian influenced art unearthed in Dandan Oilik, East Syriac Christian and Manichaean murals discovered in Karakhoja (also Koço or Qocho), she also touches on the subject of Tibetan art. In the last chapter the author returns to the west to give an account of the early Christian art of Armenia, Georgia and Caucasian Albania.

== Contents ==
- Introduction (pp. 7–10);
- Chapter One: "The World of the Transcaucasian and Central Asian Nomads" (pp. 11–53);
- Chapter Two: "The smaller kingdoms of Transcaucasia and the Persian highlands during the first millennium ʙᴄ" (pp. 54–74);
- Chapter Three: "Soghdia, Ferghana and Chorasmia from Achaemenid to Islamic times" (pp. 75–122);
- Chapter Four: "Bactria and North-Western India from Achaemenid to Islamic times" (pp. 123–172);
- Chapter Five: "Eastern Turkestan in the Roman and Buddhist Periods" (pp. 173–220);
- Chapter Six: "Armenia, Georgia and Caucasian Albania in Early Christian times" (pp. 221–262);
- Bibliography (pp. 263–264);
- Maps (pp. 265–267);
- Chronology of Ancient Orient, Greater Caucasian Area, Russian Central Asia, Afghanistan, India and Eastern Turkestan from 3000 BC to 1000 AD (pp. 268–269);
- List of Illustrations (pp. 270–281);
- Index (pp. 282–288);

== Reception ==
The illustrations in Ancient Arts of Central Asia received positive reviews from academic critics, while the text has been strongly criticised.

In his review for Bulletin of the School of Oriental & African Studies, the British archaeologist David Bivar wrote: 'The illustrations bring together a valuable range of photographs, many previously available to the Western reader only in out-of-the-way Soviet publications. The quality of reproduction both in the 205 half-tone illustrations and the 47 in colour is very creditable, and represents good value at the price. In her text the author places the illustrations in their historical context, and discusses the various threads of influence which link one artistic school with another.'

The Canadian literary critic George Woodcock also gave the chosen illustrations a positive review, but severely criticised the text: 'The reader will be impressed by the haunting unity which the magnificently chose illustrations evoke, and by the way in which a group of minor schools of art, each influenced by greater traditions at the point of decay (Hellenic, Achaemenian, Byzantine, Indian) and each producing a relatively small number of masterpieces, can emerge when displayed together as a definable Eurasian tradition. [...] Good and abundant as the illustrations are, much is lost by the inexcusable deficiencies of the text. The lesser of these deficiencies is to be found in the discrepancy one often encounters between captions to prints and descriptions of the illustrated items in the text. A Sassanian dish is dated in a caption 3rd century BC and in the text, accurately, 3rd century AD. [...] Even the text does not escape gross inaccuracies. We find, for example, a puzzling reference to "the rulers of the Gupta Valley" (meaning the Gupta emperors); [...] suggestions, which have utterly no support in historical evidence, such as that the Seleucids ruled in Gandhara and Menander in Turkestan. [...] It is unpardonable that a writer with Mrs. Rice's reputation should impose on the public so shoddy and careless a text.'

Lorenz S. Leshnik of Central Asiatic Journal felt that the book is 'well-illustrated', but a 'hurriedly written product', and 'the shortcomings of this volume must give cause for concern'. 'Inaccuracies abound', such as 'St. Thomas (18–72 AD) is believed to have visited Azes I (reigned circa 48/47–25 BC)' (pp. 144–145), 'the dynasty of Gondophares (incorrectly written "Gondolphus") was overthrown by the Kushans in about 64 AD, who then established close contacts with Augustan Rome (Augustus died in 14 AD)' (p. 145), 'it is thought that Mani lived and studied at Bamyan' (p. 165) instead of India, just to name a few. Leshnik concluded at the end of his review: 'In general, there is too much concern with origins and influences and the descriptive comments are unconvincing. [...] In a book for the layman, the names of authorities, to whom reference is occasionally made, should have been introduced with some sort of identifying remark.'

Richard N. Frye, American scholar of Central Asian studies, expressed strong disapproval of Rice's work, writing: 'Does she have to write such books in the series "The World of Art Library" in a hurry to please the publisher? There is nothing new in the book under review, many errors, and some nice pictures; for whom is the book written? [...] I cannot recommend this book, nor is there much point in continuing this review. It was obviously written in haste and should be so read.'

== International editions ==
Title	Literal translation	Language	Country	Publisher	Year of publication
Ancient Arts of Central Asia	–	English	United Kingdom	Thames & Hudson	1965
Ancient Arts of Central Asia	–	English	United States	Praeger Publishing	1965
Kunst van Centraal-Azië	'Art of Central Asia'	Dutch	Netherlands	W. Gaade	1965
Stara umetnost centralne Azije	'Ancient Art of Central Asia'	Serbian (Latin script)	Yugoslavia	Jugoslavija	1968
Staré umění Střední Asie	'Ancient Art of Central Asia'	Czech	Czechoslovakia	Odeon	1973
هنرهای باستانی آسیای مرکزی تا دوره اسلامی	'Ancient Arts of Central Asia Up to the Islamic Period'	Persian	Iran	University of Tehran Press	1993
هنرهای باستانی آسیای مرکزی	'Ancient Arts of Central Asia'	Persian	Iran	گستره (Gostareh)	2011

== See also ==
- Azerbaijani art
- Kushan art
- Manichaean art
- Serindian art
- Sogdian art
- Sogdian Daēnās
- Sampul tapestry
- Viśa Īrasangä
- Mogao Christian painting
- Murals from the Christian temple at Qocho
