= World religions =

Category in the study of religion

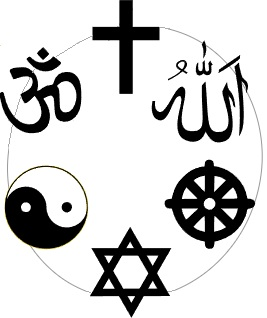
Symbols commonly associated with six of the religions labelled "world religions": clockwise from the top, these represent Christianity, Islam, Buddhism, Judaism, Taoism, and Hinduism.

World religions is a socially-constructed category in the study of religion that demarcates religions deemed to have been especially large, internationally widespread, or influential in the development of human societies. It typically consists of the "big five" religions: Buddhism, Christianity, Hinduism, Islam, and Judaism. These are often juxtaposed against categories such as folk religions, Indigenous religions, and new religious movements (NRMs).

The concept was proposed by German sociologist Max Weber in 1915, and appears to have been based on earlier work by the pioneering religious studies scholar Cornelis Tiele (1877; see §History section below). The "world religions" paradigm was developed in the United Kingdom during the 1960s, pioneered by scholars of religion such as Ninian Smart. It was intended to broaden the study of religion beyond its focus on Christianity by including other large religious traditions. The paradigm is often used for undergraduate study of religion. The emphasis on viewing these religious movements as distinct and mutually exclusive has also had a wider impact on the categorisation of religion—for instance in censuses.

Since the late 20th century, the paradigm has faced critique by scholars of religion such as Jonathan Z. Smith, who have argued that the world religions paradigm is inappropriate because it takes the Protestant branch of Nicene Christianity as the model for "religion"; that it is encumbered by discourses on modernity, including power relations in modern society; that it encourages an uncritical understanding of religion; and that it judges what religions should be considered "major". Others have argued that it remains useful in the classroom, so long as students are made aware that it is a socially-constructed category.

== Definition ==
The scholars of religion Christopher R. Cotter and David G. Robertson described the "World Religions paradigm" as "a particular way of thinking about religions which organizes them into a set of discrete traditions with a supposedly 'global' import." It typically consists of the "Big Five" religions: Buddhism, Christianity, Hinduism, Islam, and Judaism. As noted by Cotter and Robertson, the "Big Five" religions are often listed in an "Abrahamocentric order" which places the largest three Abrahamic religions—Christianity, Judaism, and Islam—before the Dhārmic, non-Abrahamic religions Hinduism and Buddhism. The category is sometimes also extended to include other major religious groups, namely the Baháʼí Faith, Sikhism, and/or Zoroastrianism.

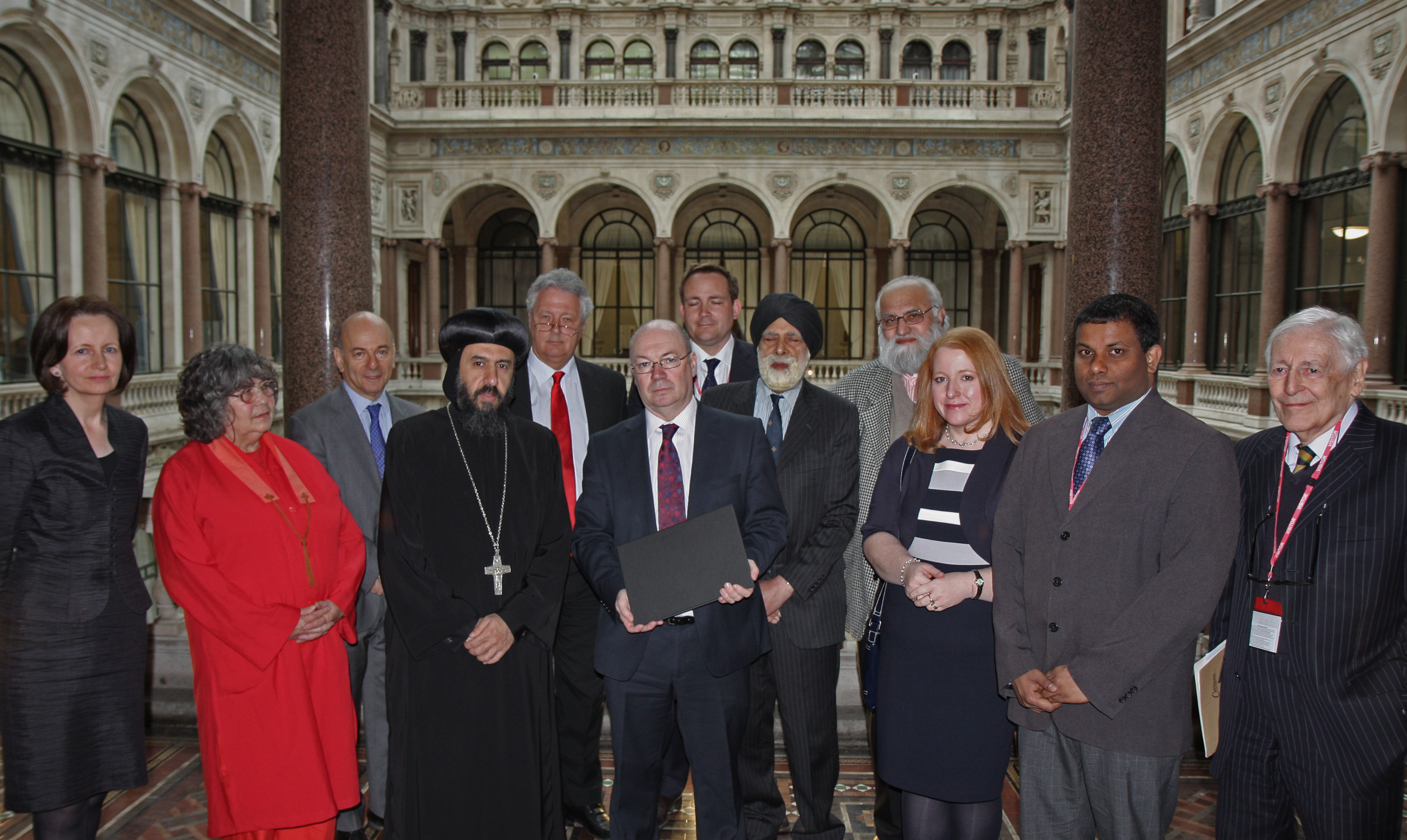
A 2013 interfaith event in the United Kingdom featuring proponents of the Baháʼí Faith, Buddhism, Christianity, Hinduism, Islam, Judaism, and Sikhism, all belief systems classified as "world religions".

The inclusion of Judaism in the "Big Five" raises some issues; it is included in the list because of its influence on Christianity and Islam and because of its relevance to traditional Eurocentric understandings of Western history. On demographic grounds, it does not fit into the list, for there are far fewer Jews in the world than there are Christians, Muslims, Hindus, and Buddhists. Similarly, it does not fit into the list if the groups are defined by a desire to spread internationally, because Judaism historically has been a non-proselytizing religion.

Many scholars have utilised the "world religions" category alongside other "catch-all" categories such as "new religious movements" and "Indigenous religions". The scholar of religion Steven J. Sutcliffe compared the relationship between the three categories to the English football league system, with the "world" religions forming a Premier League, the "new" religions forming a Championship, and "Indigenous" religions a First Division. That groups that get placed in categories like "Indigenous religions" get treated less seriously than the "world religions" by many scholars was noted by the scholar of religion Graham Harvey, who maintained that "indigenous religions should receive similarly respectful treatment to that considered appropriate to the larger 'World Religions'."

== History ==
While the World Religions paradigm was brought in to allow the inclusion of non-Christian religions in education, it has instead remodelled them according to liberal Western Protestant Christian values (akin to what the Church of England promotes), emphasizing theological categories.

— Scholar of religion Suzanne Owen, 2011

Cornelis Tiele proposed that religions develop in phases, from being nature religions, to becoming mythological religions, then doctrinal religions, and ultimately as world or universal religions. The last stage, qualitatively different in kind, aspiring to be accepted by all men, and based upon abstract principles and maxims. In these categories, Tiele in 1877 placed Buddhism, Christianity, and Islam as universal religions.

By 'world religions,' we understand the five religions or religiously determined-systems of life-regulation which have known how to gather multitudes of confessors around them. The term is used here in a completely value-neutral sense. The Confucian, Hinduist, Buddhist, Christian, and Islamist religious ethics all belong to the category of world religion.

— The Social Psychology of the World Religions by Max Weber, 1915

Of Weber’s five “world religions,” four — Christianity, Islam, Hinduism, and Confucianism — are associated with major civilizations. The fifth, Buddhism, is not. Why is this the case? ... Overall, however, the virtual extinction of Buddhism in India and its adaptation and incorporation into existing cultures in China and Japan mean that Buddhism, although a major religion, has not been the basis of a major civilization.

— The Clash of Civilizations and the Remaking of World Order by Samuel P. Huntington, 1996

Cotter and Robertson noted that the history of the World Religions paradigm is "intimately tied up" with the history of the study of religion as an academic discipline. It emerged from within the phenomenology of religion approach which placed an emphasis on description rather than critical analysis.

The paradigm was integrated throughout the education system through work of scholars like Ninian Smart, who formed the Shap Working Party on World Religions in Education in 1969. It was introduced with the intent of moving Western education away from its focus on Christianity. However, it took liberal Western Protestantism as its baseline and interpreted these different religious traditions through the framework of liberal Protestant norms and values. This included an emphasis on theology as being central to a given religion. It also reflects the post-Enlightenment Christian approach of treating different religious groups as distinct, mutually exclusive categories. It thus reflects the socio-political concerns of 1960s Britain, the environment in which it was devised.

The paradigm has since gone beyond this academic discipline, and "informs the perception" of many members of different religious groups. The paradigm for instance frames the teaching about religion in the British education system; at all three Key Stages, British teachers are instructed to teach about Christianity, while by the end of key Stage 3 they are also supposed to teach about the other "five principal religions": Buddhism, Hinduism, Islam, Judaism, and Sikhism. Similarly, the censuses of many countries for instance reflect the influence of the world religion paradigm by only permitting respondents to describe themselves as adhering to one particular religious tradition, whereas in reality many individuals identify themselves with various different traditions at the same time.

This idea of mutually exclusive religious identities is not only a Western phenomenon, but can also be found in other socio-cultural contexts; Hindu nationalists for instance often endorse the idea that Hinduism and Buddhism are mutually exclusive categories despite the fact that many people in South Asia mix Hindu and Buddhist practices. Scholars of religion Tara Baldrick-Morrone, Michael Graziano, and Brad Stoddard stated that "the WRP is neither neutral nor natural, but its social authority derives from appearing as both."

== Criticism ==
A "world religion" is a tradition that has achieved sufficient power and numbers to enter our history to form it, interact with it, or thwart it. We recognise both the unity within and the diversity among the world religions because they correspond to important geopolitical entities with which we must deal. All 'primitives,' by way of contrast, may be lumped together, as may the 'minor religions,' because they do not confront our history in any direct fashion. From the point of view of power, they are invisible.

— Scholar of religion J. Z. Smith, 1998

The utility of the World Religions paradigm has experienced a sustained and rigorous critique from many scholars of religion. The scholar of religion Graham Harvey for instance noted that many scholars "object strongly" to the paradigm. In 1978, the scholar of religion Jonathan Z. Smith called it a "dubious category".

One of the major criticisms of the framework is that it is based on a model of "religion" that relies on the Protestant branch of Nicene Christianity as its base example. A second criticism is that it is rooted in the discourses of modernity, including the power relations present in modern society. Smith observed that it was constructed by Western scholars from a Western perspective. He noted that the only religions that get included in it are those which have "achieved sufficient power and numbers to enter our [i.e. Western] history, either to form it, interact with it, or to thwart it" and represent "important geo-political entities with which we must deal."

The framework also includes privileging the literate elites active in particular religious movements by presenting their interpretations of particular traditions as being authoritative, eclipsing alternative interpretations presented by non-literate, marginalised, and localized practitioners. For instance, as noted by the scholar of religion Suzanne Owen, "Hinduism as a World Religion does not include Hinduism as a village religion".

A third criticism of the World Religions paradigm is that it encourages an uncritical and sui generis model of "religion". It presents each of the "world religions" in an abstracted and essentialized form, failing to take account of hybridization. For instance, in teaching about Christianity it does not refer to reincarnation, because this is not typically regarded as a Christian doctrine, and yet there are Christians who profess a belief in reincarnation. A fourth criticism is that in choosing to focus attention on the "major religions", it makes a value judgement as to what constitutes "major" and what does not.

=== Paradigm in pedagogy ===
Many scholars of religion have resisted efforts to challenge the World Religions paradigm, and as of 2016 was reported as still being widespread in university introductory courses to the study of religion. Many instructors feel that explaining the critique of the world religions paradigm to undergraduate students would be difficult, as the critique would be too complex for many of them to understand. Its continued use has also been defended by the claim that it is what undergraduate students expect and that it mirrors what they will have been taught at school.

Some scholars have argued for the rejection of the World Religions paradigm altogether; for instance, Cotter and Robertson presented the argument that "the continued uncritical use of the WRP fosters a breeding ground for relativistic navel-gazing which has no place in the contemporary research university". Owen was of the view that "as long as it continues to employ the World Religions paradigm as a default approach (even after deconstructing it), religious studies will fail in its humanistic task" because it will simply be engaging in "knowledge transfer" and not "critically engaging" with "culture and knowledge".

One alternative framework that some scholars use to teach about religion is the "lived religion" paradigm, which places emphasis not on distinct religious traditions but on individual experiences and practices. Another alternative is the "material religion" framework which focuses on examining religion through material culture and physical objects. Owen noted that, in her experience, many students display an "initial resistance to alternatives" as they are expecting the World Religions paradigm. She cited the example of her introductory course at Leeds Trinity University College, which was constructed on thematic lines rather than according to the world religions paradigm, and which induced feelings of panic among many undergraduates.

Many scholars who are critical of the World Religions paradigm find themselves having to teach it as part of introductory courses for undergraduate students. Some spent much of a course teaching the concept and then several sessions after this deconstructing it. Some scholars have suggested that even when students are taught using the World Religions paradigm, it could be a good means of encouraging them to think critically about category formation. The scholar Steven W. Ramey for instance advocated teaching the paradigm in a manner that makes it clear that it is a "constructed discourse".

Similarly, Baldrick-Morrone, Graziano, and Stoddard suggested that teaching undergraduates about the world religious paradigm helps to explain to students how "classification is a social act". They noted that students could leave such a course not only knowing more about the specific religious traditions included in the World Religions paradigm, but that they would also leave "knowing how to better interrogate the world around them". To avoid promoting the paradigm's portrayal of different religious traditions as rigid, homogenous categories, the scholar Teemu Taira suggested introducing ethnographic case studies into the class to better explain the realities of people's lives and uses of religious traditions.

== See also ==
- Comparative religion
  - Baháʼí Faith and the unity of religion
  - Buddhism and other religions
  - Christianity and other religions
  - Hinduism and other religions
  - Islam and other religions
  - Judaism and other religions
- List of religious populations
  - Major religious groups
- Religious pluralism
- Religious war
- Sociology of religion
- Three Persian religions
