= Viśa Īrasangä =

Khotanese painter

- Known for: Painting
- Style: Central Asian art
- Father: Viśa Baysūna

Viśa Īrasangä (Khotanese: Viśa Īrasangä; in traditional Chinese: 尉遲乙僧; simplified Chinese: 尉迟乙僧; pinyin: Yùchí Yǐsēng; Wade–Giles: Yü^{4}-chʻih^{2} I^{3}-sêng^{1}; fl. 7th century) was a Khotanese painter during the Tang dynasty. He was also a Khotanese nobleman, but sometimes he is considered to be a Tocharian originated from the north of Afghanistan. His father Viśa Baysūna (尉遲跋質那; Yùchí Bázhìnà) was well known by his paintings during the Sui dynasty, he was referred to as "Yuchi the Elder" (大尉遲) by Chinese people. Thereby Īrasangä was known as "Yuchi the Younger" (小尉遲). His painting skills were often compared with Yan Liben, even the famous painter Wu Daozi was under his influence.

Īrasangä was notable for creating Buddhist and foreign exotic portraits. He came to the Chinese court in the mid 7th century. He brought a new painting style of Iranian origin and had profound influence in Chinese Buddhist art. He was credited with having helped bring the Western technique of using a line of unvarying thickness to outline figures—the "iron-wire" line—to the Buddhist temples in many Chinese cities.

== Gallery ==
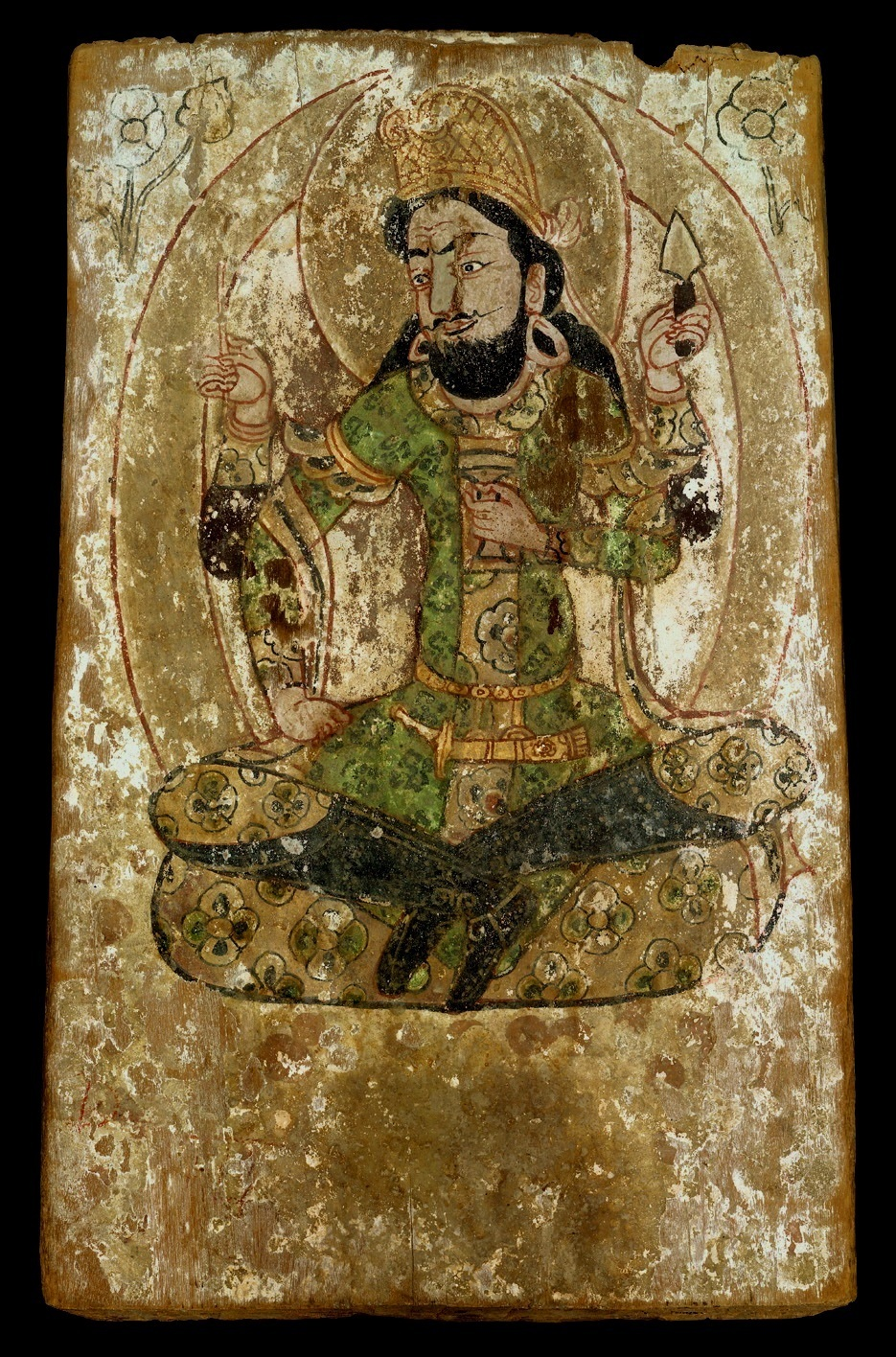
Painting of a Persian deity on the reverse of a painted panel, probably depicting the legendary hero Rustam.

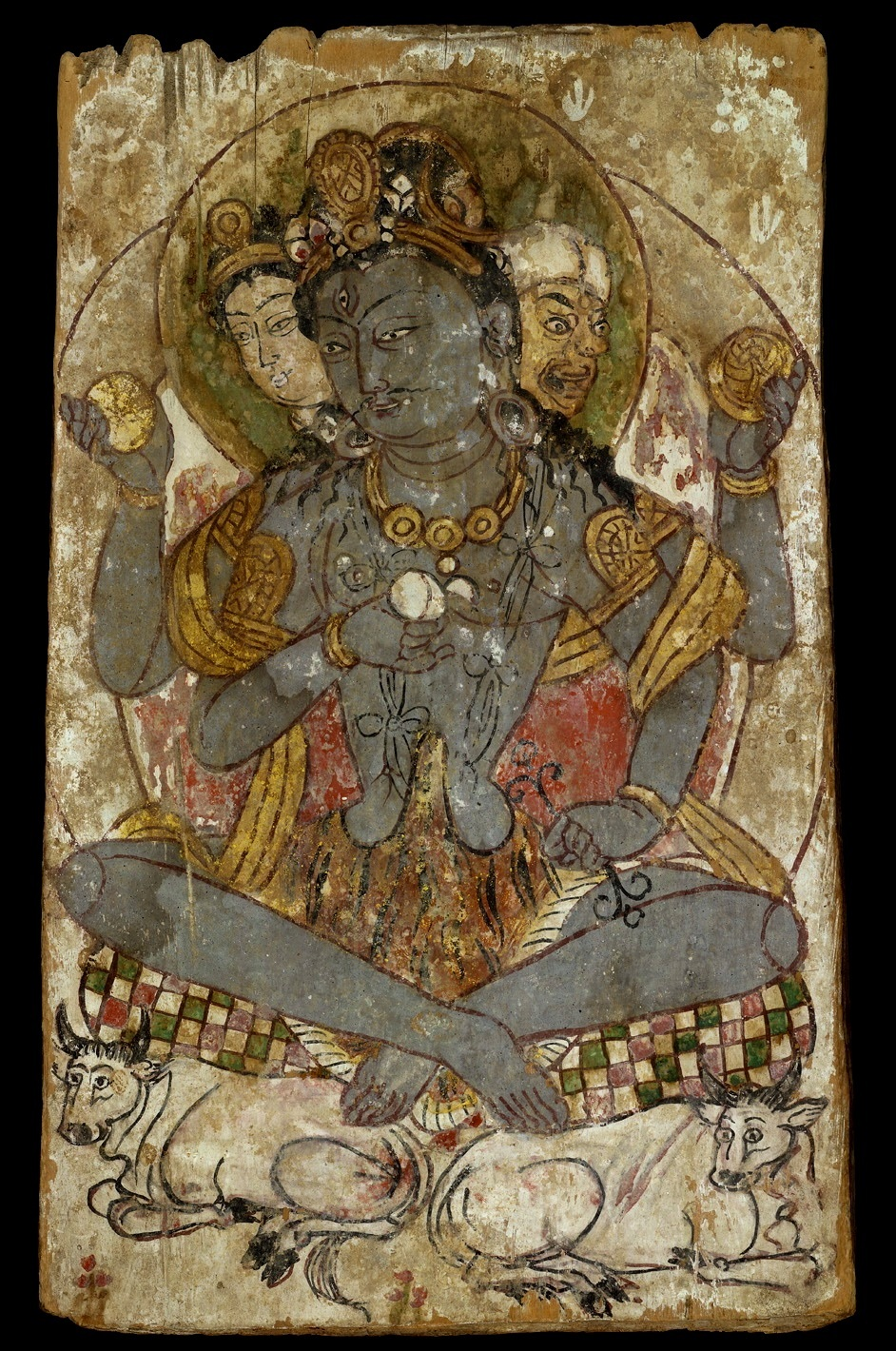
Painting of an Indian deity on the obverse of a painted panel, most likely depicting Shiva (Maheśvara).

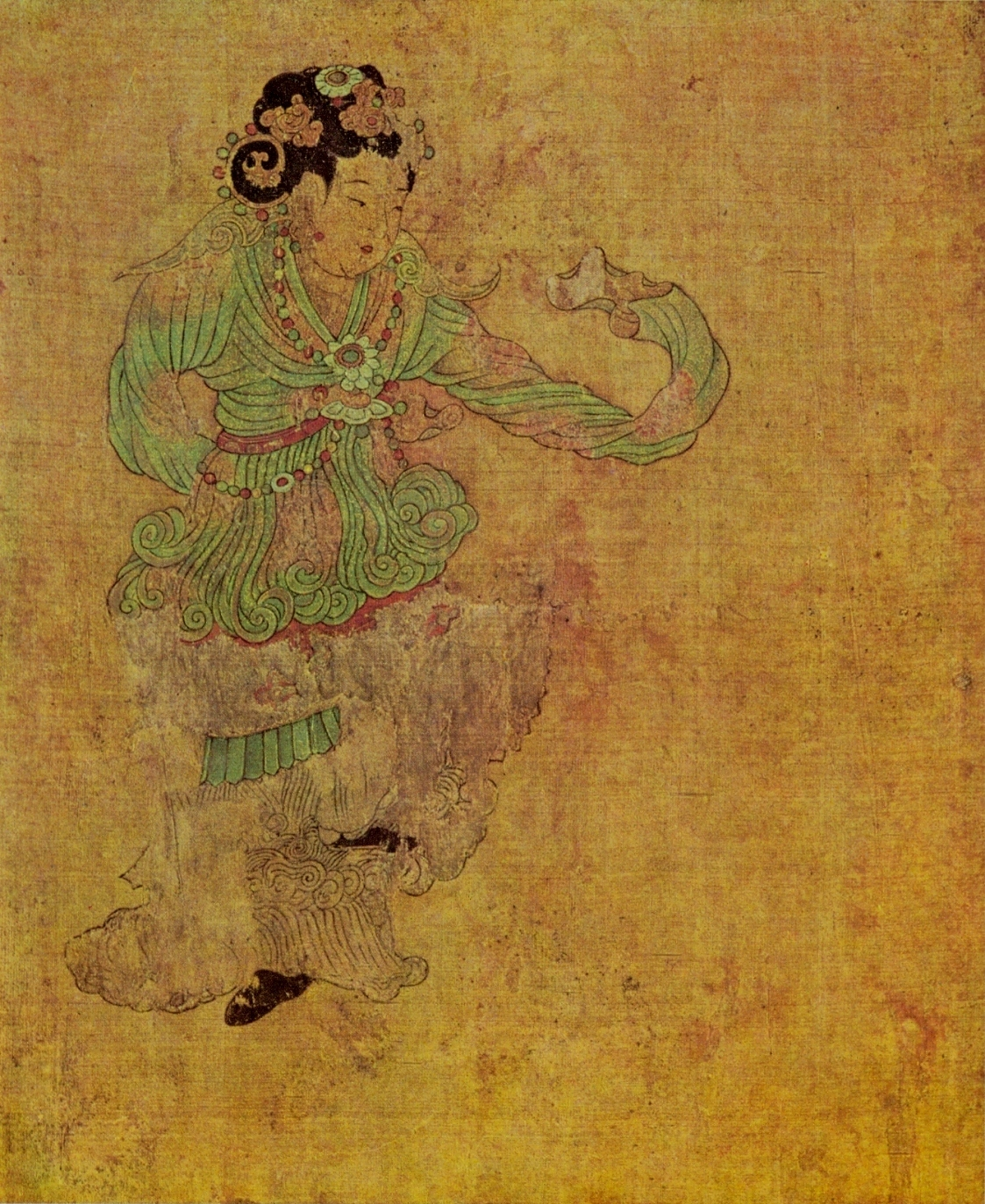
So-called "Kuchean Dancer", traditionally attributed to Viśa Īrasangä.

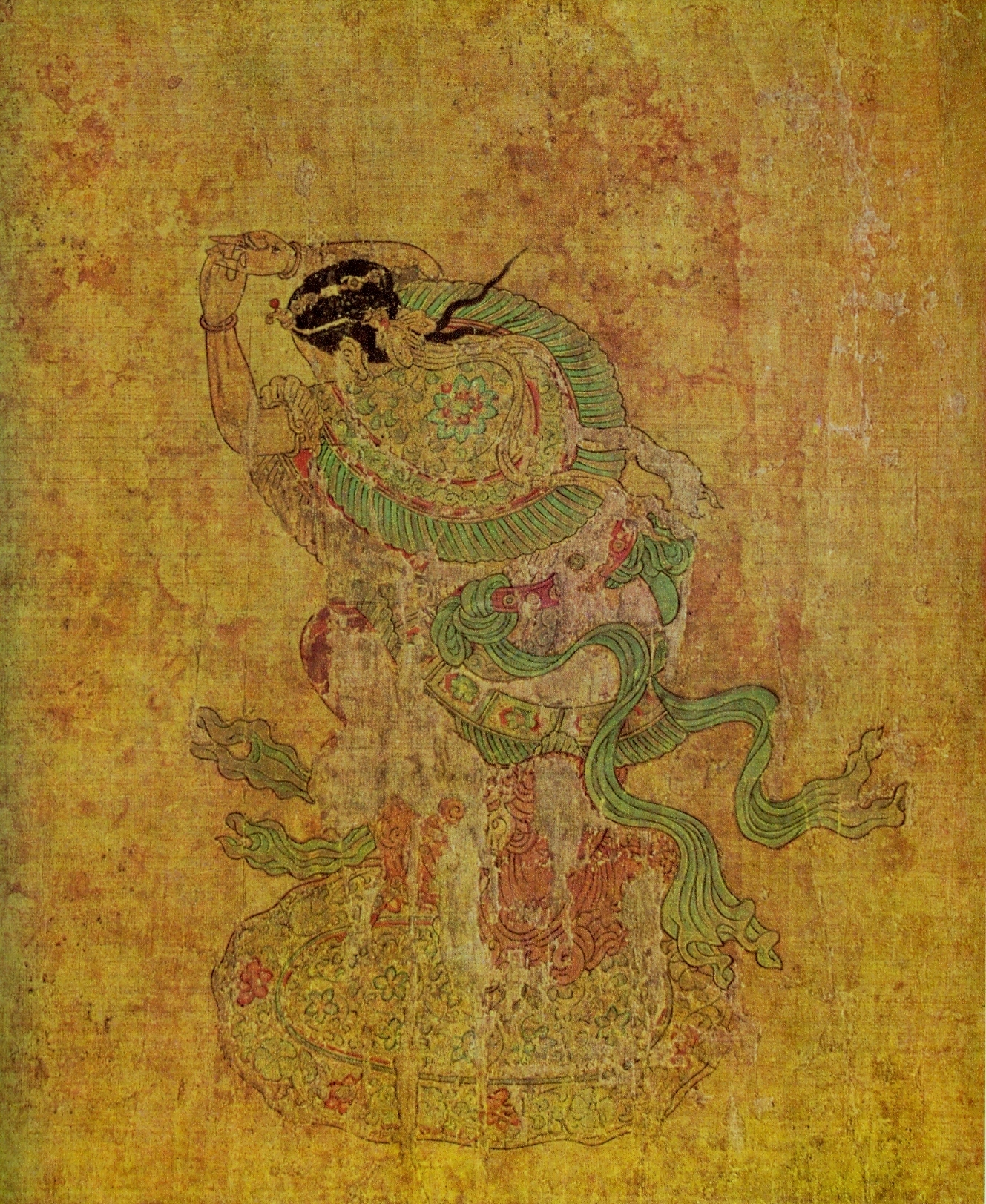
So-called "Kuchean Dancer", traditionally attributed to Viśa Īrasangä.

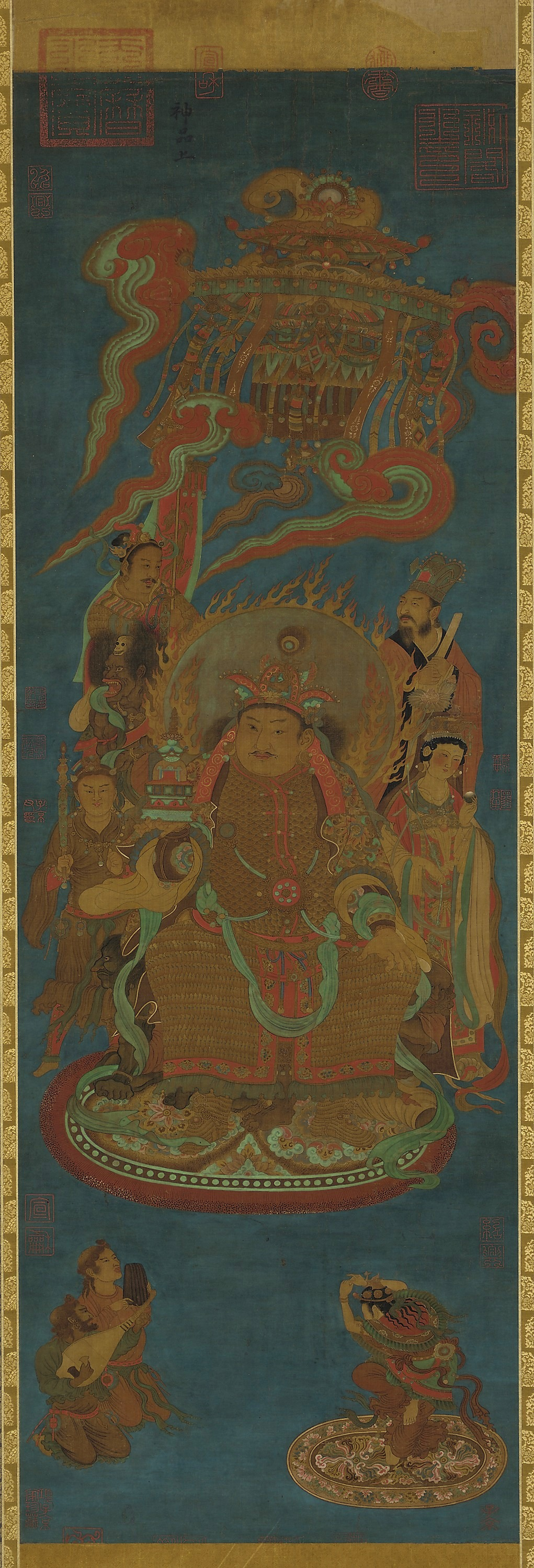
Vaiśravaṇa, traditionally attributed to Viśa Īrasangä.

== See also ==
- Serindian art
- Sogdian Daēnās
- Ancient Arts of Central Asia
