= Sogdian Daēnās =

10th-century Sino-Sogdian line drawing

- 粟特神祇白畫 (Chinese), Deux divinités féminines (French)
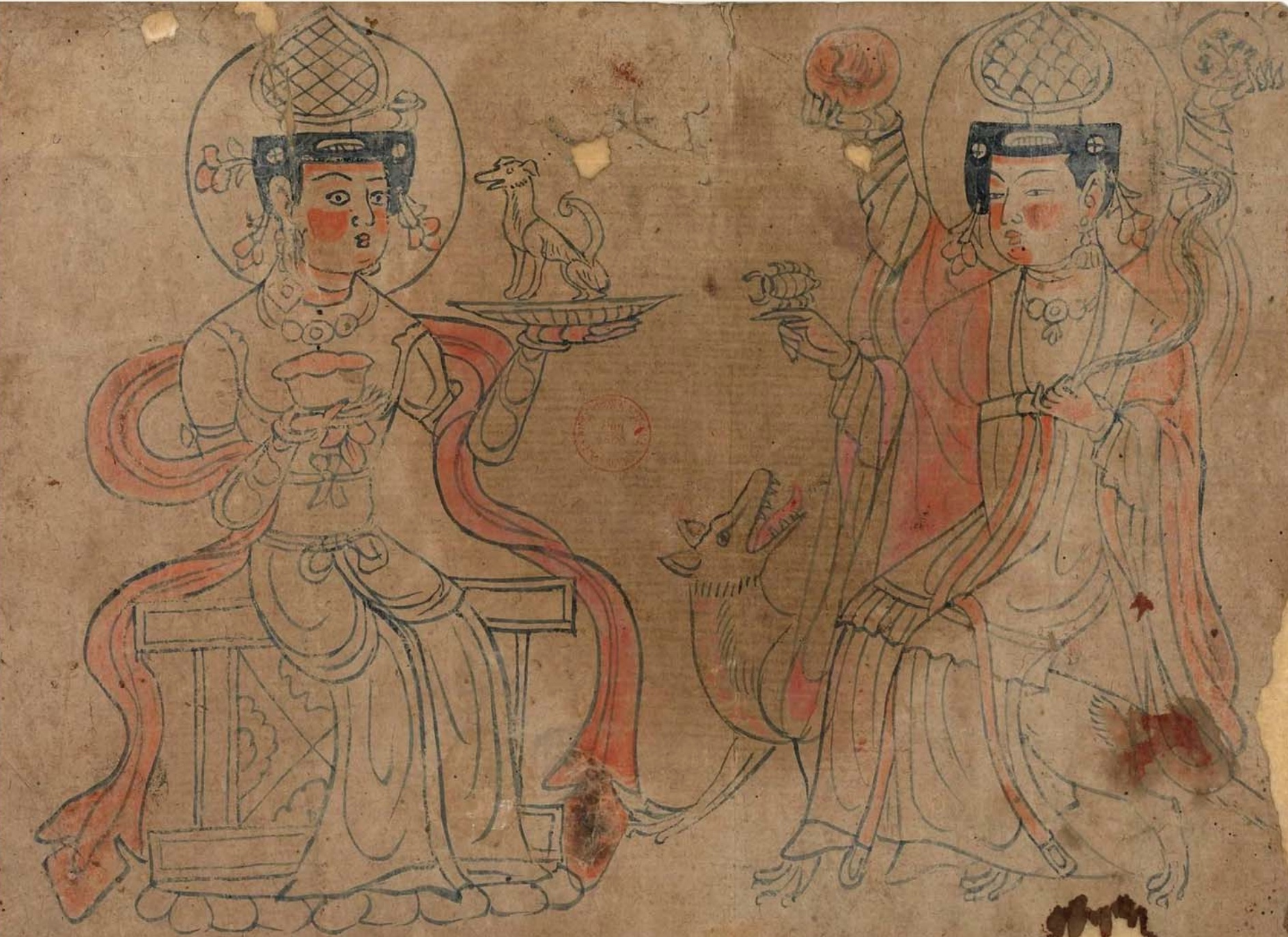
- Artist: Unknown
- Year: 10th century
- Type: Ink with light colouring on paper
- Dimensions: 30.5 cm × 37.8 cm (12.0 in × 14.9 in)
- Location: Bibliothèque nationale de France; Paris

Sogdian Daēnās, also known as Sogdian Deities (French: Deux divinités féminines; Chinese: 粟特神祇白畫) is a line drawing discovered by the French Orientalist Paul Pelliot at the Mogao Caves, Dunhuang, dated to the 10th-century Guiyi period. It is probably associated with the Zoroastrian cult of the Sogdian people. The historian Zhang Guangda, a member of the Academia Sinica of Taiwan, recognised this "paper image" as one of the "pieces of paper depicting Mazdean deities for the saixian celebration". (Note: The saixian or sai-hsien (in Chinese: 賽祆) is a cultic practice, a Zoroastrian festival celebrated by the Sogdians in the 9th to 10th-century Guiyi Dunhuang. Xianjiao or Hsien-chiao (祆敎) is the Chinese term for "Zoroastrianism".) This piece is part of the Pelliot chinois collection of the Bibliothèque nationale de France.

== Description ==
This sketch, painted on paper in black ink with light colouring, depicts two ladies sitting opposite each another, their heads being encircled by nimbi. Both are represented holding various attributes: the lady on the left, who sits on a rectangular throne supported by a row of lotus petals, holds a foliated cup and a tray with a dog seated on it. The one on the right is seated on a dog or wolf, and has four arms, the upper two supporting the sun and moon discs, the lower two arms holding a scorpion and a snake. They wear a characteristic hairstyle, surmounted by a water-drop-shaped or peach-shaped headdresses that are probably made of metal.

== Analysis ==
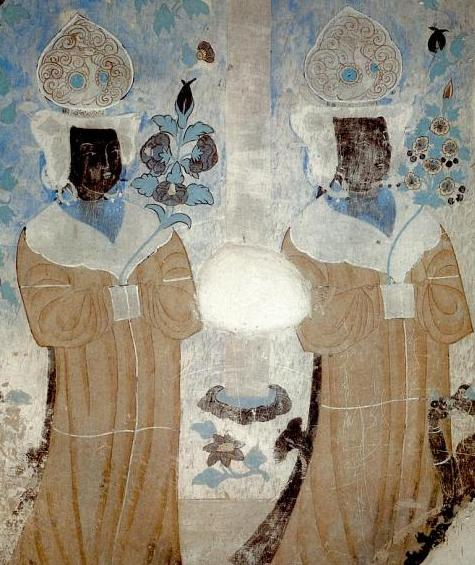
Fresco of 10th-century Uyghur princesses of the Kara-Khoja Kingdom wearing similar hairstyle and headdress found at the Mogao Caves.

The drawing had been published in Jao Tsung-I's The Line Drawing of Dunhuang in 1978, but has only attracted the interest of researchers since it was displayed in the Sérinde exhibition in 1995.

The peach-shaped headdress resembles the hairstyle of the Uyghur princess. The dress of the lady on the left, at least, does not seem to correspond to the Chinese fashion at the time, and both representing the expression of foreign beliefs. According to Lilla Russell-Smith, the painting was most likely "commissioned by a Buddhist Uyghur donor who was still very much influenced by Manichaean thought" or possibly "a Manichaean Uyghur who was already deeply influenced by Buddhist ideas of rebirth."

According to Jiang Boqin (姜伯勤)—a professor at Sun Yat-sen University—it is a piece of Zoroastrian art, and the four-armed deity is a Sogdian goddess worshipped in their Zoroastrian cult, whose name is Nanâ, or Nanaia, the goddess originated from Mesopotamia. Frantz Grenet—a French specialist on Sogdiana and Zoroastrianism—and the historian Zhang Guangda argue that the lady on the left representing Daēnā, the good according to Zoroastrian vision; the other one represents Daēva, the bad. Jiang Boqin agrees with Grenet and Zhang that the deity on the left being Daēnā, but he determined the one on the right is the goddess Nanâ.

== See also ==
- Serindian art
- Viśa Īrasangä
- Mogao Christian painting
- Zoroastrianism in Sichuan
- Ancient Arts of Central Asia
