= Biolo =

Biolo is an Italian surname. Notable people with the surname include:

- John Biolo (1916–2003), guard in the National Football League and American Football League
- Martina Biolo (born 1996), Italian professional racing cyclist

== See also ==
- Bielo
