= Tamara Talbot Rice =

Russian and British art historian (1904–1993)

- Born: Elena Abelson; 19 June 1904; Saint Petersburg, Russian Empire
- Died: 24 September 1993 (aged 89); Bourton-on-the-Water, England
- Occupation: Art historian
- Spouse: David Talbot Rice (m. 1927; died 1972)
- Children: Nina Talbot Rice Elizabeth Talbot Rice Nick Talbot Rice

Academic background
- Education: Cheltenham Ladies' College; St Hugh's College, Oxford

Academic work
- Discipline: Russian art

Tamara Talbot Rice (19 June 1904 – 24 September 1993) was a Russian then English art historian, writing on Byzantine, Russian, and Central Asian art.

Talbot Rice was born Elena Abelson, to Louisa Elizabeth ("Lifa") Vilenkin and Israel Boris Abelevich Abelson, the latter a businessman and member of the Czar's financial administration. Leo Tolstoy was her godfather. Elena lived a privileged childhood in Saint Petersburg, initially attending Tagantzeva Girls' School. The Russian Revolution of 1917 prompted her family to move to England, and she completed her schooling, first at Cheltenham Ladies' College and then at St Hugh's College, Oxford.

In 1927 she married the English art historian David Talbot Rice, and spent much time travelling abroad with him on archaeological digs; they both published under the surname Talbot Rice, but are often referred to as "Talbot-Rice" or "Rice". She was a close friend of Evelyn Waugh and formed part of the 'Brideshead Revisited Circle'.

She died in 1993 and was buried next to her husband in the churchyard of St Andrew's, Coln Rogers.

== Publications (selected) ==
- 1959: Icons, London: Batchworth Press (revised edition 1960).
- 1961: The Seljuks in Asia Minor, 'Ancient People and Places' series. London: Thames and Hudson.
- 1963: A Concise History of Russian Art, 'The World of Art Library' series. London: Thames and Hudson.
- 1965: Ancient Arts of Central Asia, 'The World of Art Library' series. London: Thames and Hudson.
- 1970: Elizabeth, Empress of Russia, London: Weidenfeld & Nicolson.
