= James S. Bielo =

American socio-cultural anthropologist

James S. Bielo (born 1980) is an American socio-cultural anthropologist, specializing in the Anthropology of Religion, the Anthropology of Christianity, American Religion, Urban Anthropology, Linguistic Anthropology, and the study of Material Religion. He is an associate professor of Religious Studies at Northwestern University. He was awarded his Ph.D. in anthropology in 2007 from Michigan State University. With Carrie M. Lane, he is the series founder and co-editor of the “Anthropology of Contemporary North America" book series at the University of Nebraska Press. He is one of the founders of the AnthroCyBib, an online bibliographic resource for the anthropology of Christianity that is hosted by the University of Edinburgh. He is also a founder and co-curator of Materializing the Bible, an interactive, curated a catalogue of biblical themed environments that covers "Protestant, Catholic and, to a lesser extent Jewish and Latter-Day Saints sites, that in different ways transforms the Bible into physical, interactive and choreographed environments, for purposes of immersion, personal piety, religious education and conversion."

Most of his ethnographic work has been done with American Christian Evangelicals and Fundamentalists. His second book, Emerging Evangelicals: Faith, Modernity, and the Desire for Authenticity, was an ethnographic depiction of the then comparatively new American Emerging Church Movement; in it he described the Emergent Church as "a loose urban network of largely white, middle-class, urban, male clergy" attempting a cultural critique of what they understand as mainstream American Evangelicalism. In 2018, he published Ark Encounter: The Making of a Creationist Theme Park, a behind-the-scenes depiction of the creative process in the design of the Ark Encounter creationist theme park in Kentucky. While he focuses on the way that designers planned the theme park experience, he also takes on the substantive message being conveyed by the theme park, describing the Ark Encounter not as a rejection of science, but rather a protest against what they see as "elitism in what counts as science and who gets to be a scientist." In 2021, he published 'Materializing the Bible: Scripture, Sensation, Place' in the Bloomsbury Studies in Material Religion series. In 20 short chapters, this book is about the global and historic phenomenon of transforming written scripture into experiential, choreographed environments. Drawing from ethnographic and archival data, chapters explore high profile and little known attractions, technologies from picture postcards to Instagram, and the uses of experiential design in biblical tourism.

== Major publications ==
- 2007 “The Mind of Christ”: financial success, born-again personhood, and the anthropology of Christianity. Ethnos 72(3): 315–338.
- 2009 Words Upon the Word: An Ethnography of Evangelical Group Bible Study. New York: New York University Press.
- 2011 Purity, Danger, and Redemption: notes on urban “missional” Evangelicals. American Ethnologist 38(2): 267–280.
- 2011 Emerging Evangelicals: Faith, Modernity, and the Desire for Authenticity. New York: New York University Press.
- 2011 “How much of this is promise?” God as Sincere Speaker in Evangelical Bible reading. Anthropological Quarterly 84(3): 611–634.
- 2013 Urban Christianities: place-making in late modernity. Religion 43(3): 301–311.
- 2013 Promises of Place: a future of comparative U.S. ethnography. North American Dialogue. 16(1): 1–11.
- 2015 Anthropology of Religion: The Basics. New York: Routledge.
- 2018 Ark Encounter: The Making of a Creationist Theme Park. New York: New York University Press.
- 2018 Biblical Gardens and the Sensuality of Religious Pedagogy. Material Religion 14(1): 30–54.
- 2021 'Materializing the Bible: Scripture, Sensation, Place.' London: Bloomsbury.
