= Bulayïq =

Archaeological site in China

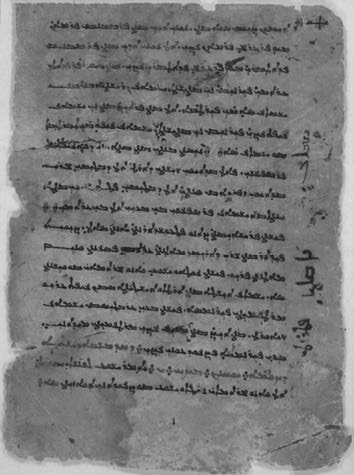
10th century, East Syriac lectionary (Luke 16), found at Bulayïq

Bulayïq (traditional Chinese: 葡萄溝; simplified Chinese: 葡萄沟; pinyin: Pútáogōu) is a locality and archaeological site in central Xinjiang province in western China. It is located 10 kilometres (6 mi) north of Turpan city in the foothills of the Tien-shan Mountains. It is also known as Bīlayuq.

The site is located in the arid Tapin basin. The remains there include a tell with mud brick ruins protruding from the desert sands. The ruins were excavated in 1905 by a German team led by Albert von Le Coq.

Among the ruins was found a monastic library, where a trove of ancient manuscripts in various Iranian languages were found. The texts show the influence of Orthodox and Nestorian Churches. Almost all known Christian religious texts in the ancient Sogdian language are from the Bīlayuq library. The texts show the development and spread of Christianity in Central Asia.

== See also ==
- Murals from the Christian temple at Qocho
