= Mogao Christian painting =

9th-century painting from China

Painting of a Christian figure
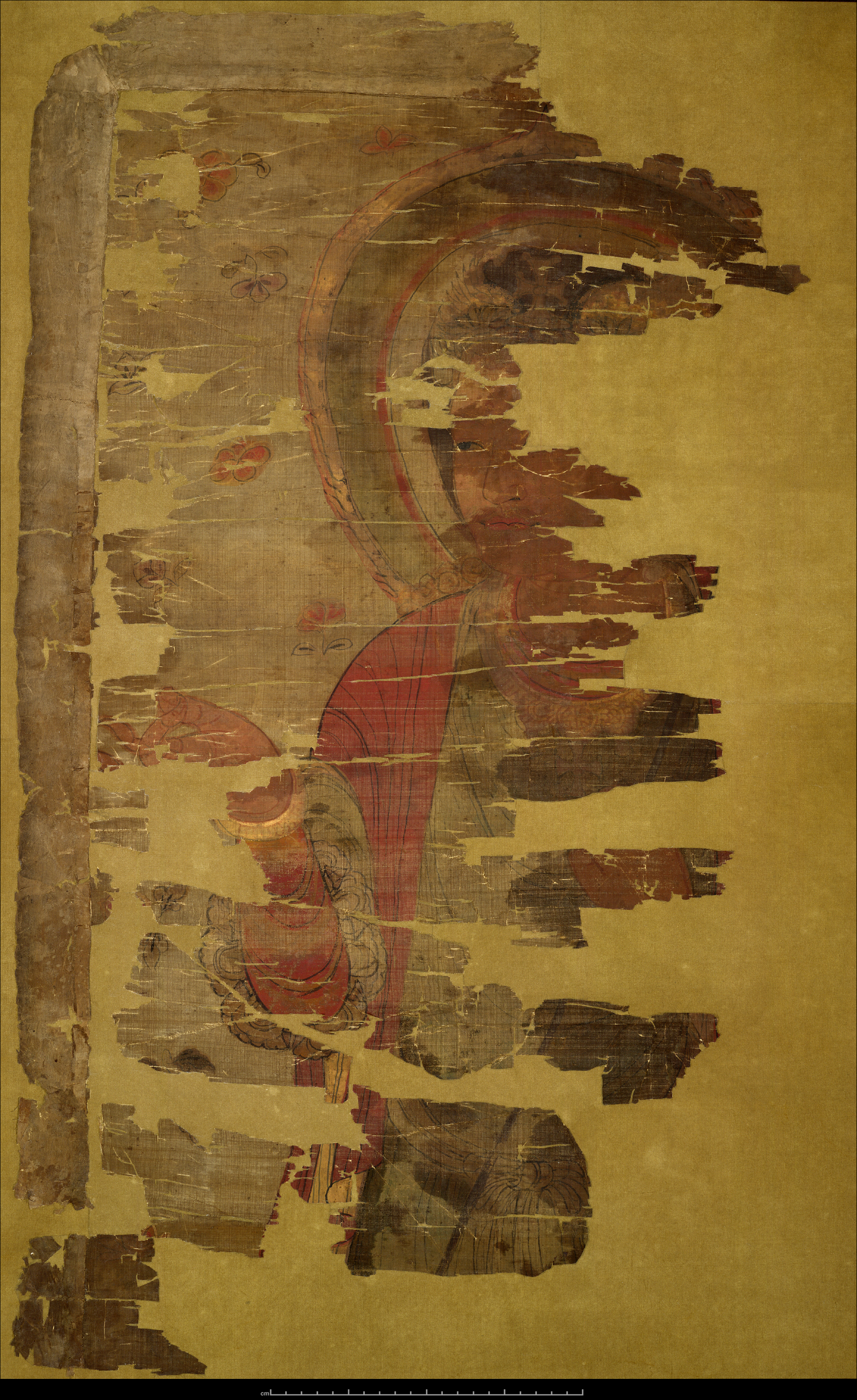
- Artist: Unknown
- Year: 9th century
- Type: Ink and colours on silk
- Dimensions: 88 cm × 55 cm (35 in × 22 in)
- Location: British Museum, London
- Accession: 1919,0101,0.48; Ch.xlix.001 (Stein number)

The Mogao Christian painting, also known as Painting of a Christian figure or Fragment of a Christian figure, is a partially-recovered silk painting which was produced in the 9th century CE in Guiyi Prefecture, a historical region of Western China. The painting depicts a haloed man with crosses on his head and chest; this figure has been interpreted as a Christian associated with the Church of the East.

The painting was recovered by the Hungarian-born British archaeologist Aurel Stein at the Library Cave (Cave 17) of the Mogao Caves in 1908, and is now kept in the British Museum, London.

== Description ==
The figure is represented in a three-quarter view in a manner very similar to some of the paintings of Bodhisattvas, even to the gesture of the right hand. The outer circle of the nimbus has flame-like decoration. He has a fairly thick moustache and a slight beard, both in red. He is wearing a silk stole of red with a yellow lining, over a garment that has faded to a greenish colour very similar to that of the background. The sleeves of the garment end in ruffs and golden bracelets adorn the wrists. A cross, each arm that ends in extensions of beads, appears both in the headdress of the figure and pendant of the necklace that he is wearing, as well as on the top of the long staff that he is holding in the left hand.

== Analysis ==
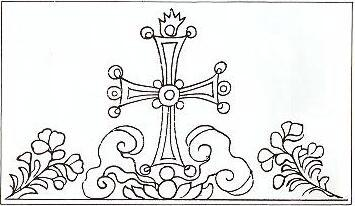
The cross-on-lotus symbol carved on the Xi'an Stele, which can also be seen in the headdress worn by the figure in this painting

According to Meicun Lin (a professor of the School of Archeology and Museology at Peking University) and Szonja Buslig (a lecturer of Eötvös Loránd University), they believe that the style of this painting deliberately imitates the reliefs at Taq-i Bustan, a site with a series of large rock reliefs from the era of Sasanian Empire. For example, both have nimbi, wear similar necklaces, and even basic positions are very similar. It is speculated that this painting was made based on the icon of Christ that the Persian missionary Alopen carried to Chang'an, the capital of the Tang Empire. (Note: The inscription on the Xi'an Stele mentions that Alopen carried with him the Christian scriptures and icons.)

The figure with the right hand held open and the thumb touching the middle finger, which is a variant of the Vitarka Mudrā, the gesture of discussion and transmission of the teachings, it is generally seen in the Hindu and Buddhist iconography. At first glance, the figure resembles a Bodhisattva, but the western features of the face, together with the red mustache and beard, which are quite different from the green, curling moustaches of Bodhisattvas, begin to hint at a different type of holy figure. That the figure is Christian is evident from the cross on the lotus in the headdress, a symbol can also be seen on the Xi'an Stele, the cross pattern on the necklace, the cross pendant and the staff of a processional cross. The headdress decorated with wings is known from the Kushano-Sasanian art and symbolises sovereignty, the curls at the shoulders remind us of the images of Gandhara Buddha. The narrow flame border of the nimbus is found throughout the Buddhist iconography of Central Asia. The background is scattered with small flowers which may serve to enhance the sanctity, and therefore the devotion (bhakti).

== Icon of Christ ==
According to the German professor Hans-Joachim Klimkeit and Swiss scholar Christoph Baumer, "the figure represents Jesus Christ or a saint". Tōru Haneda, a Japanese historian and professor of Kyoto University, argues that "the unearthed in Dunhuang must be an image of Christ". P. Y. Saeki, the Japanese scholar of religion, also considers the painting to be an icon of Jesus.

== Gallery ==
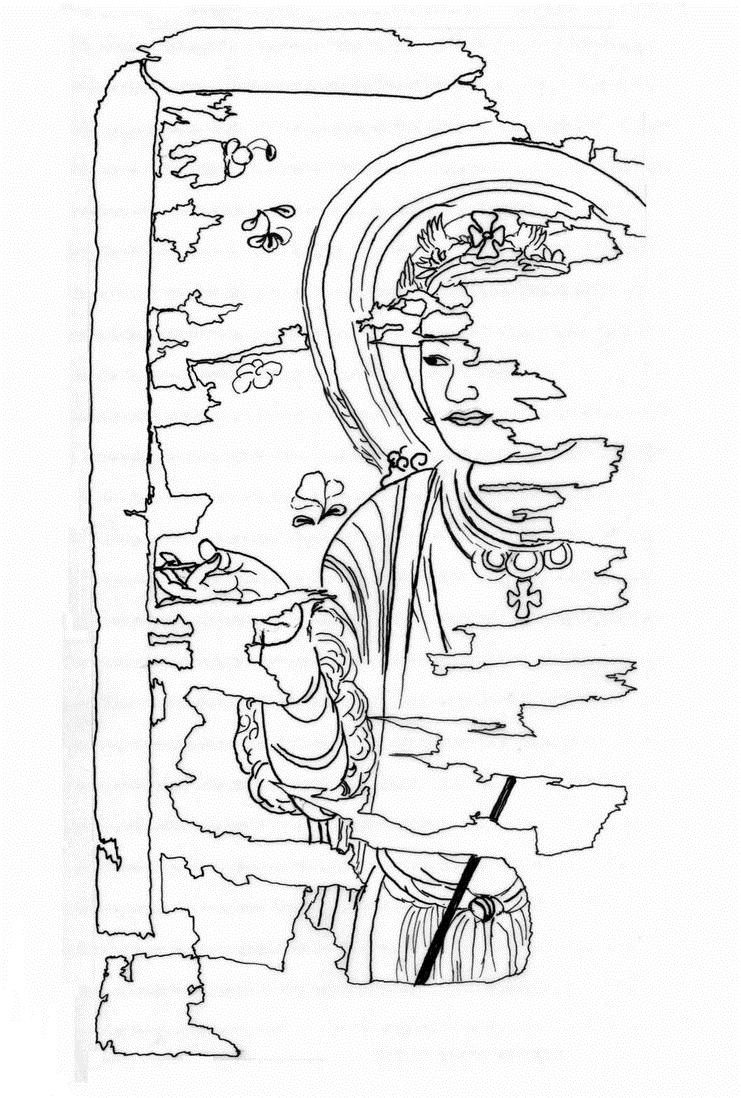
A copy

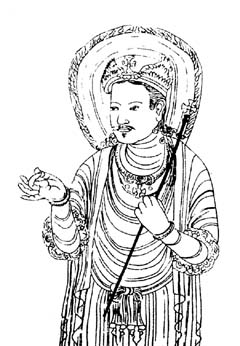
A reconstruction by a Japanese artist

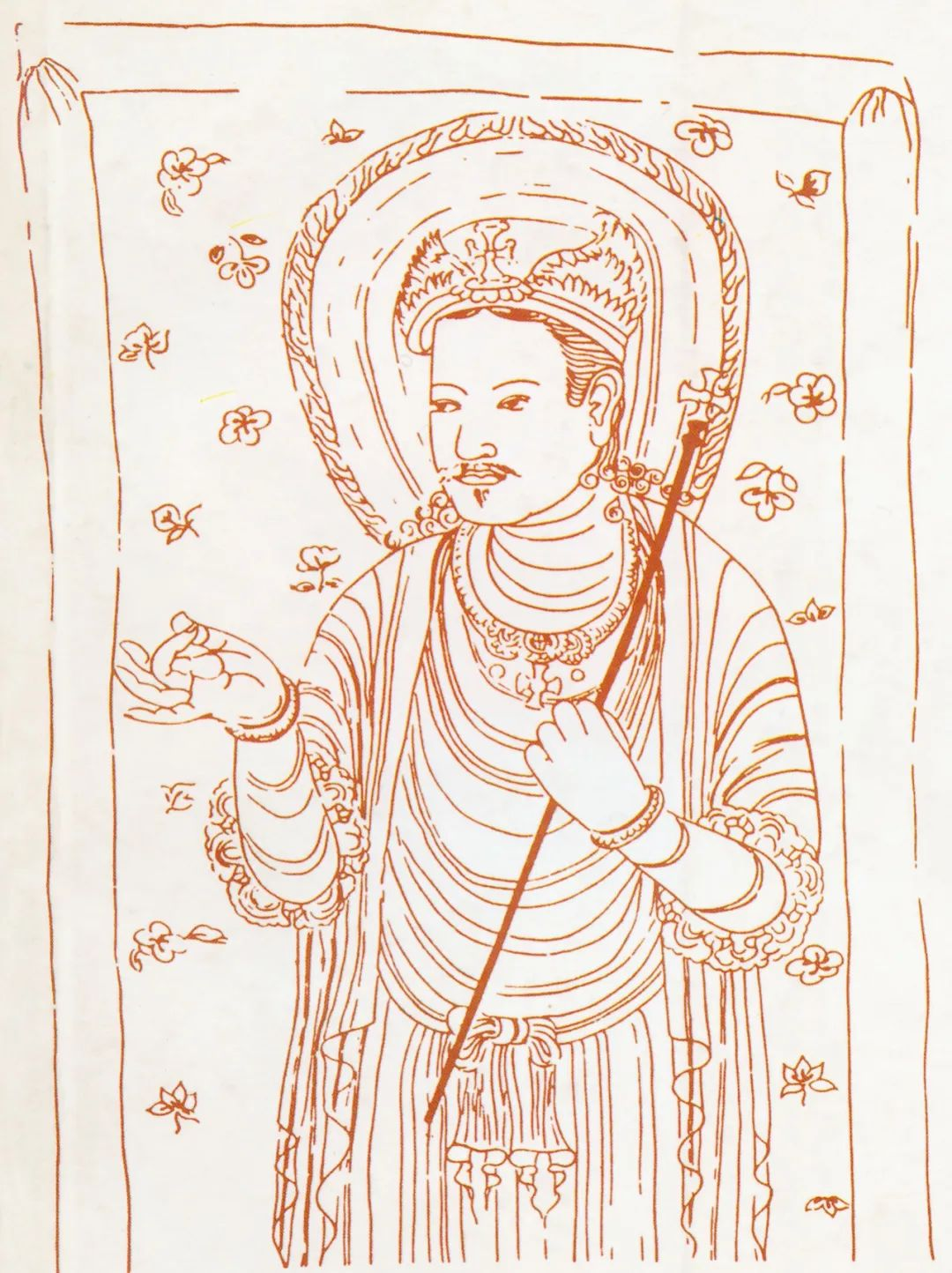
The complete reconstruction

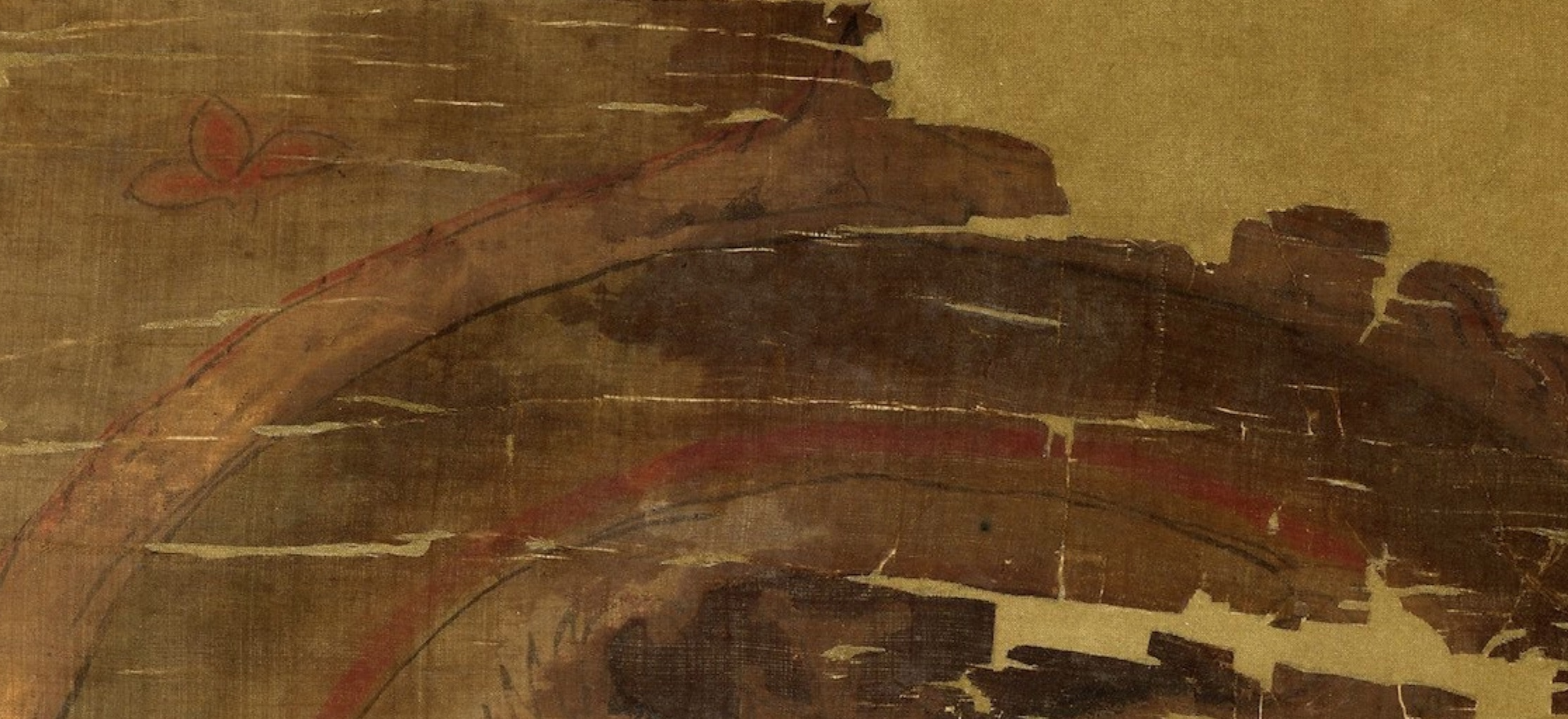
Top of the nimbus. The triangle shape is associated with fire, like a flame that peaks at the top.

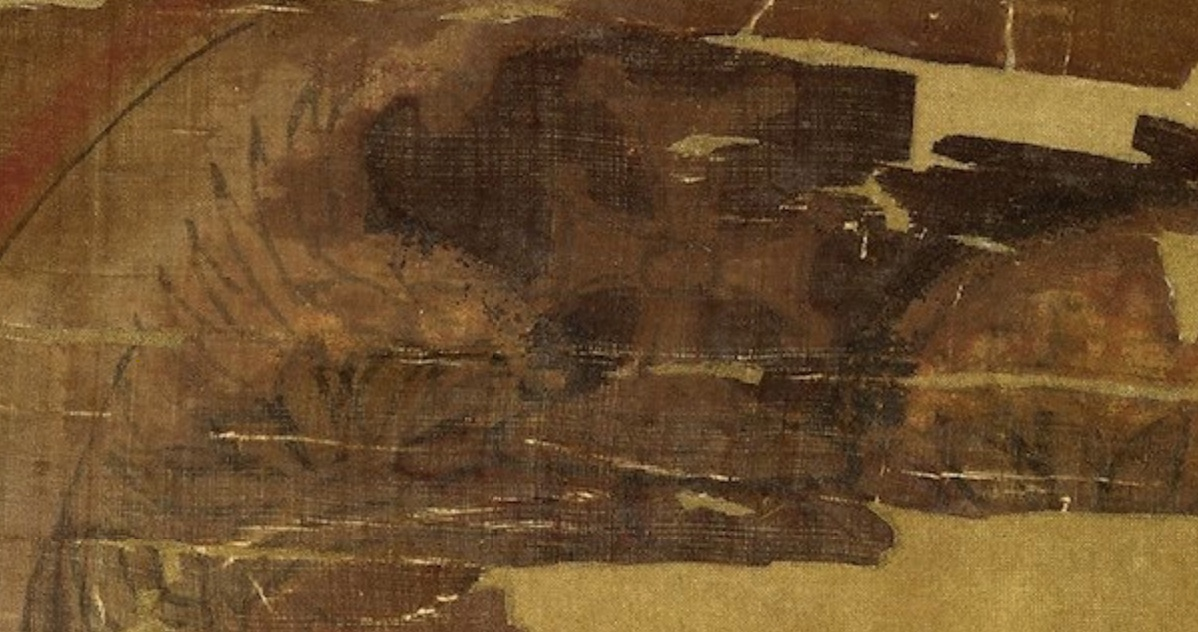
The winged or feathered headdress decorated with the cross on the lotus flower

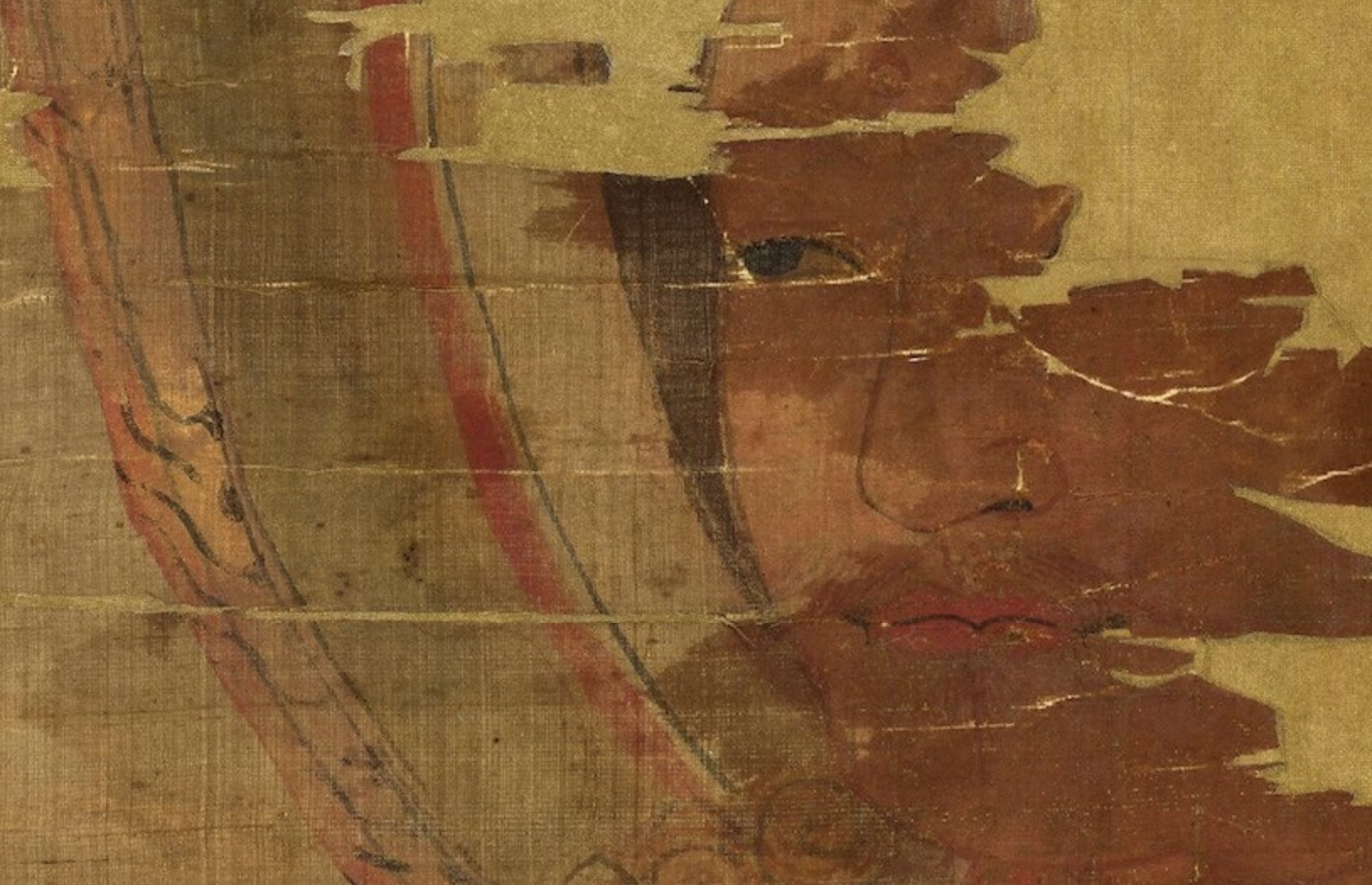
The face with red moustache and wispy beard

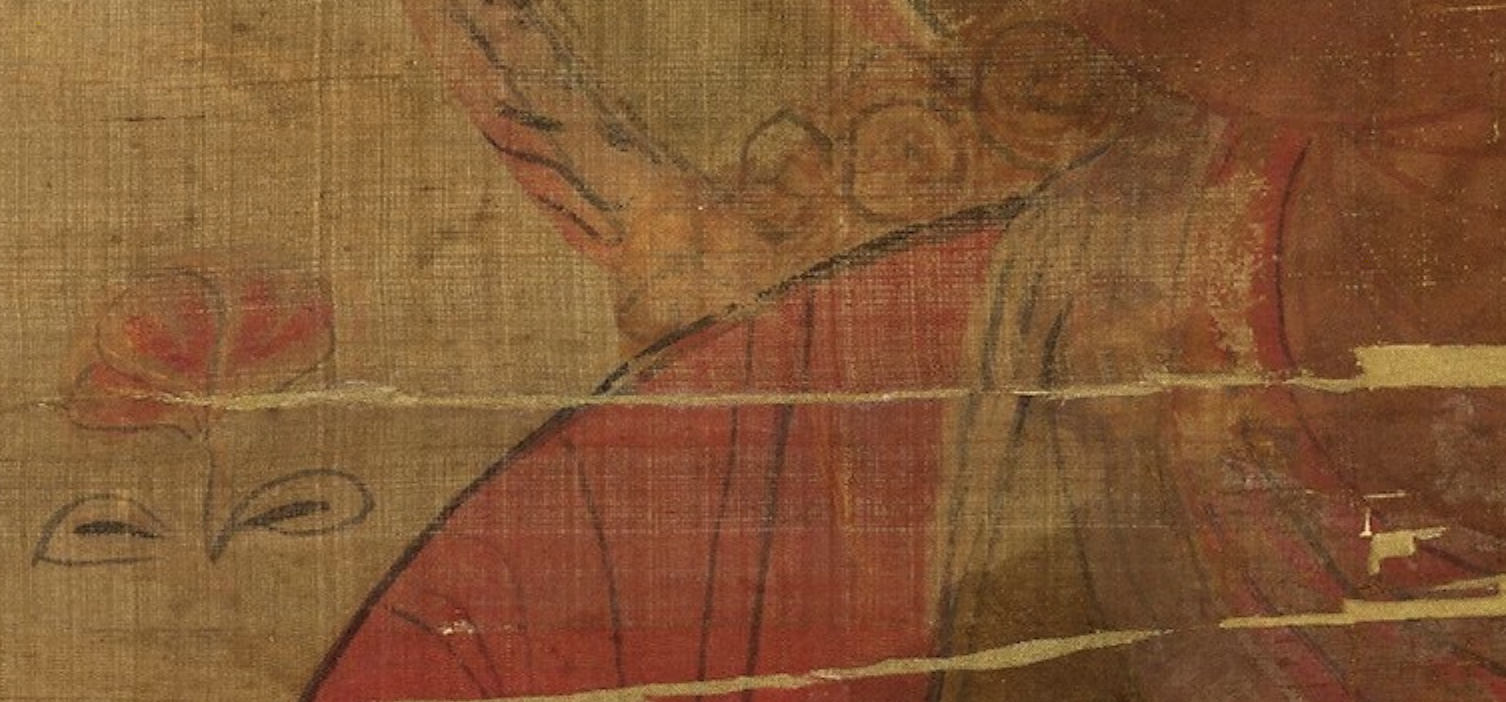
The curls at the shoulders

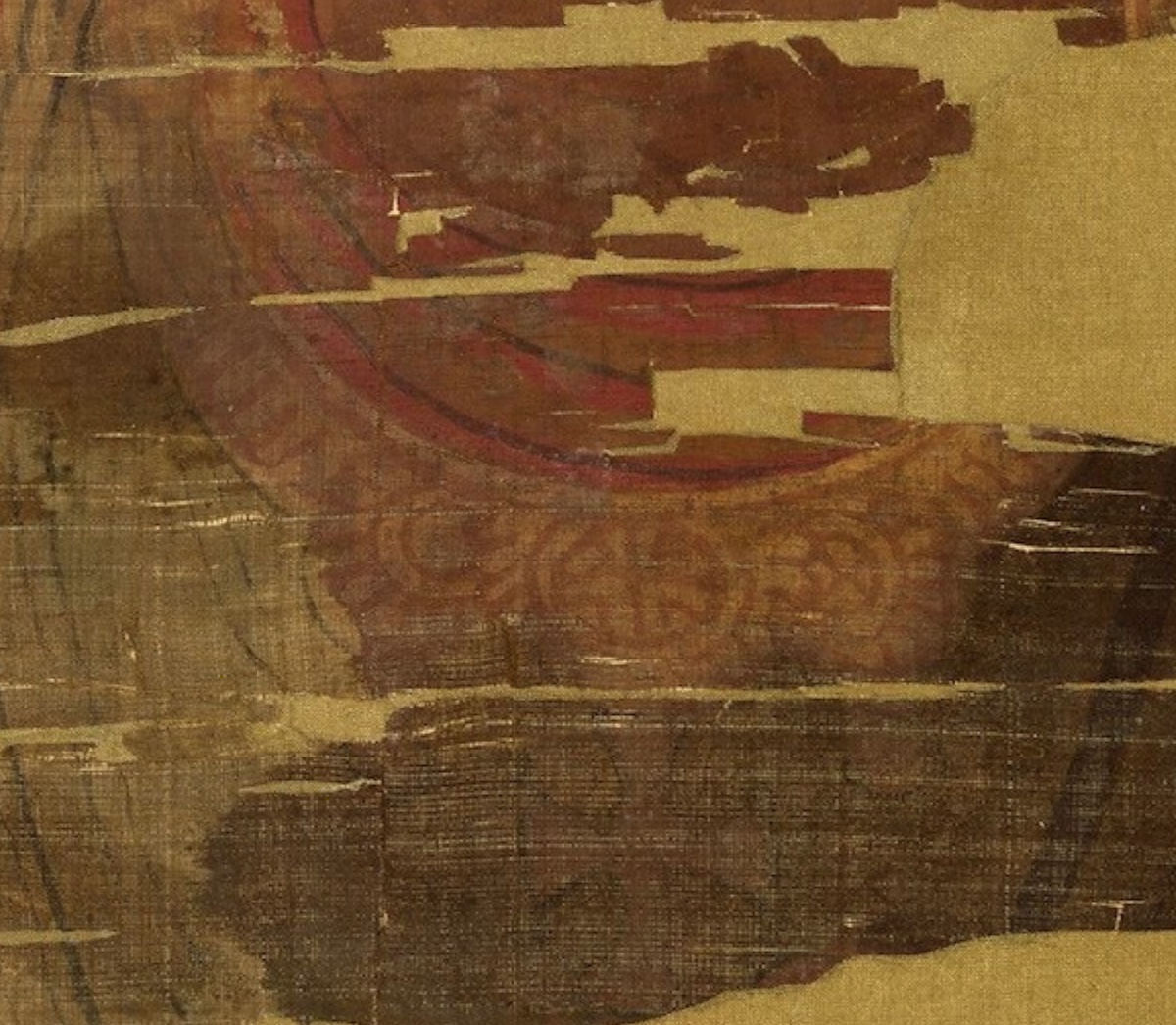
The cross pattern on the necklace and the cross pendant

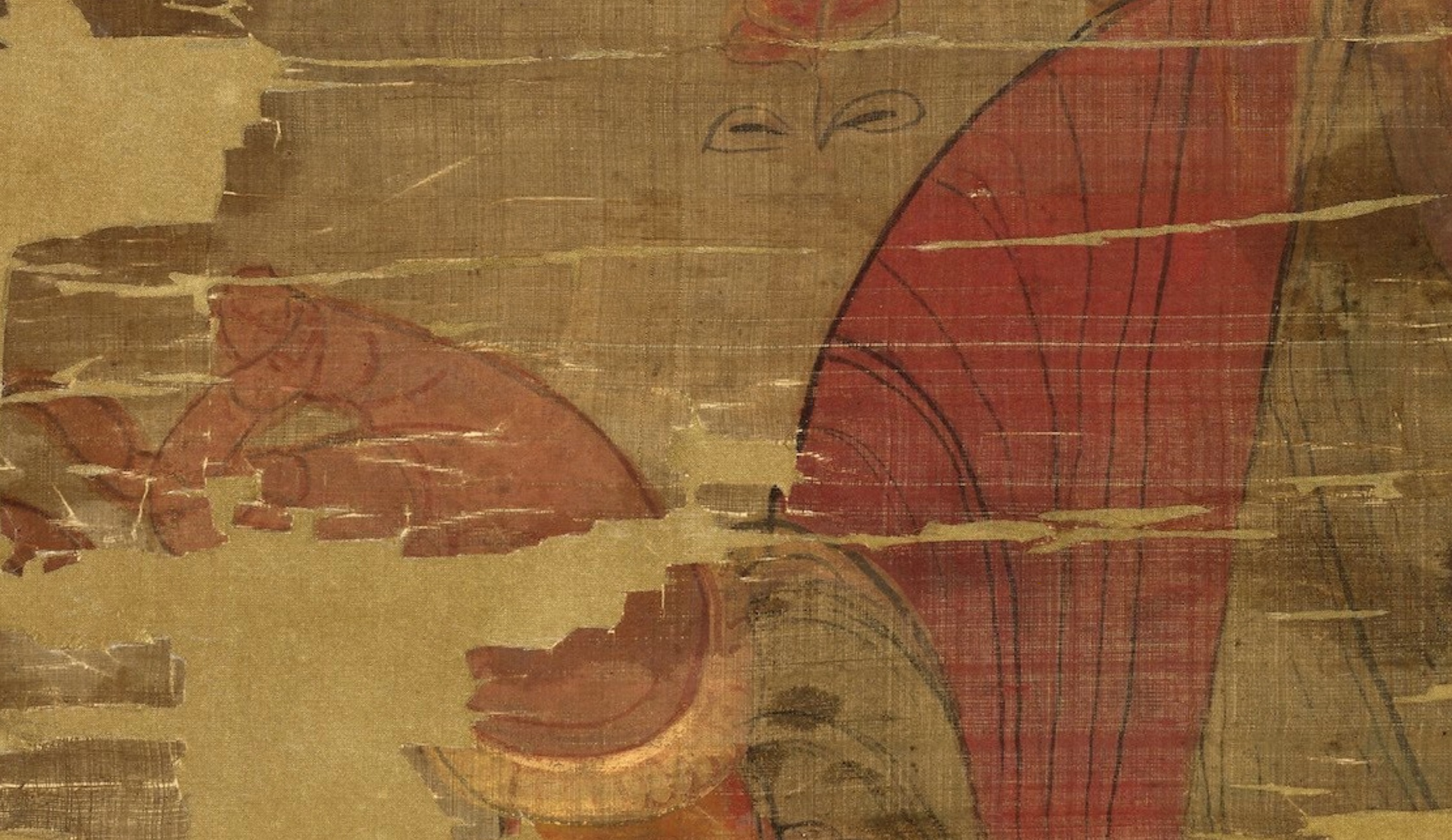
The Vitarka Mudrā

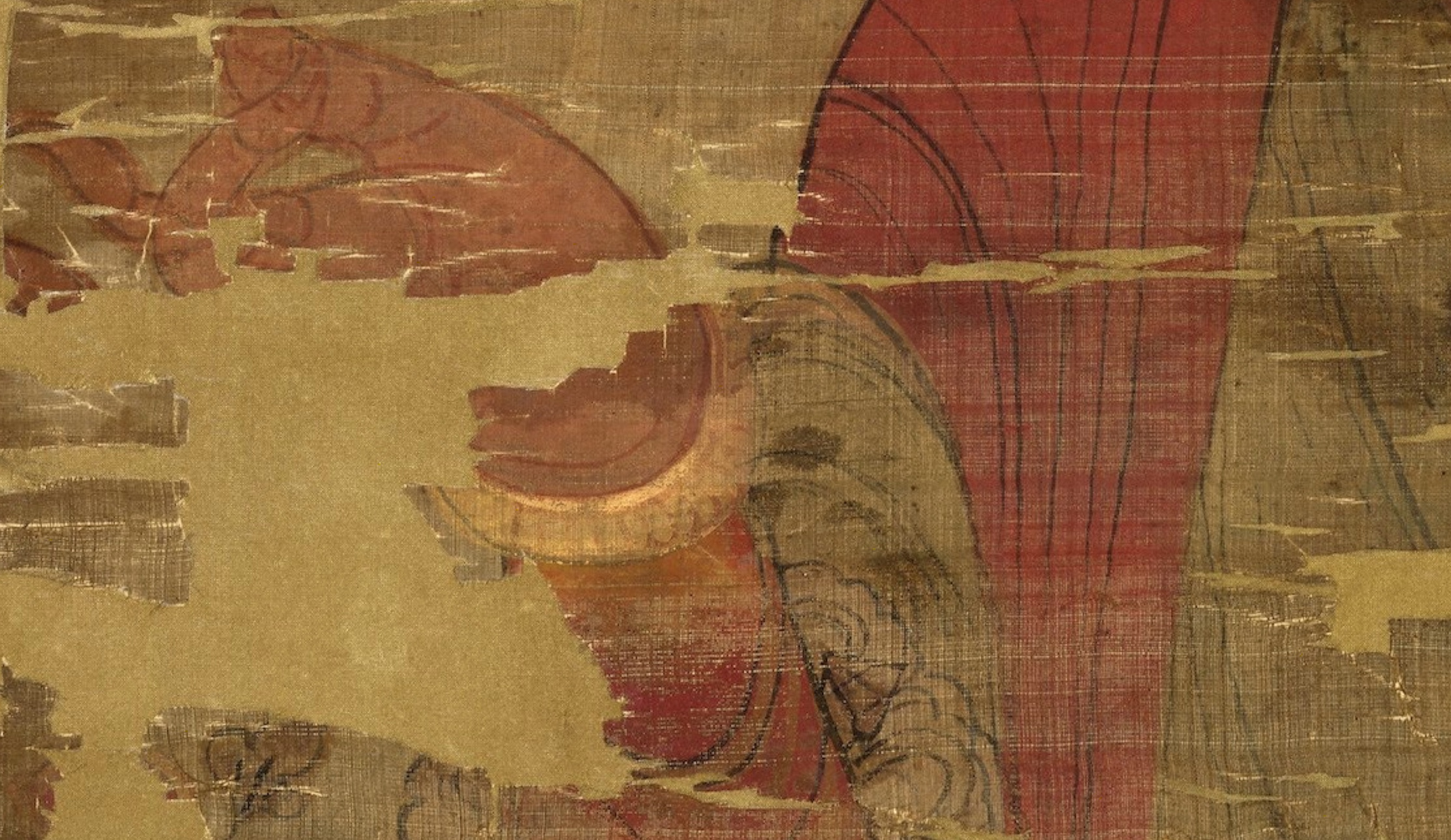
The golden bracelet

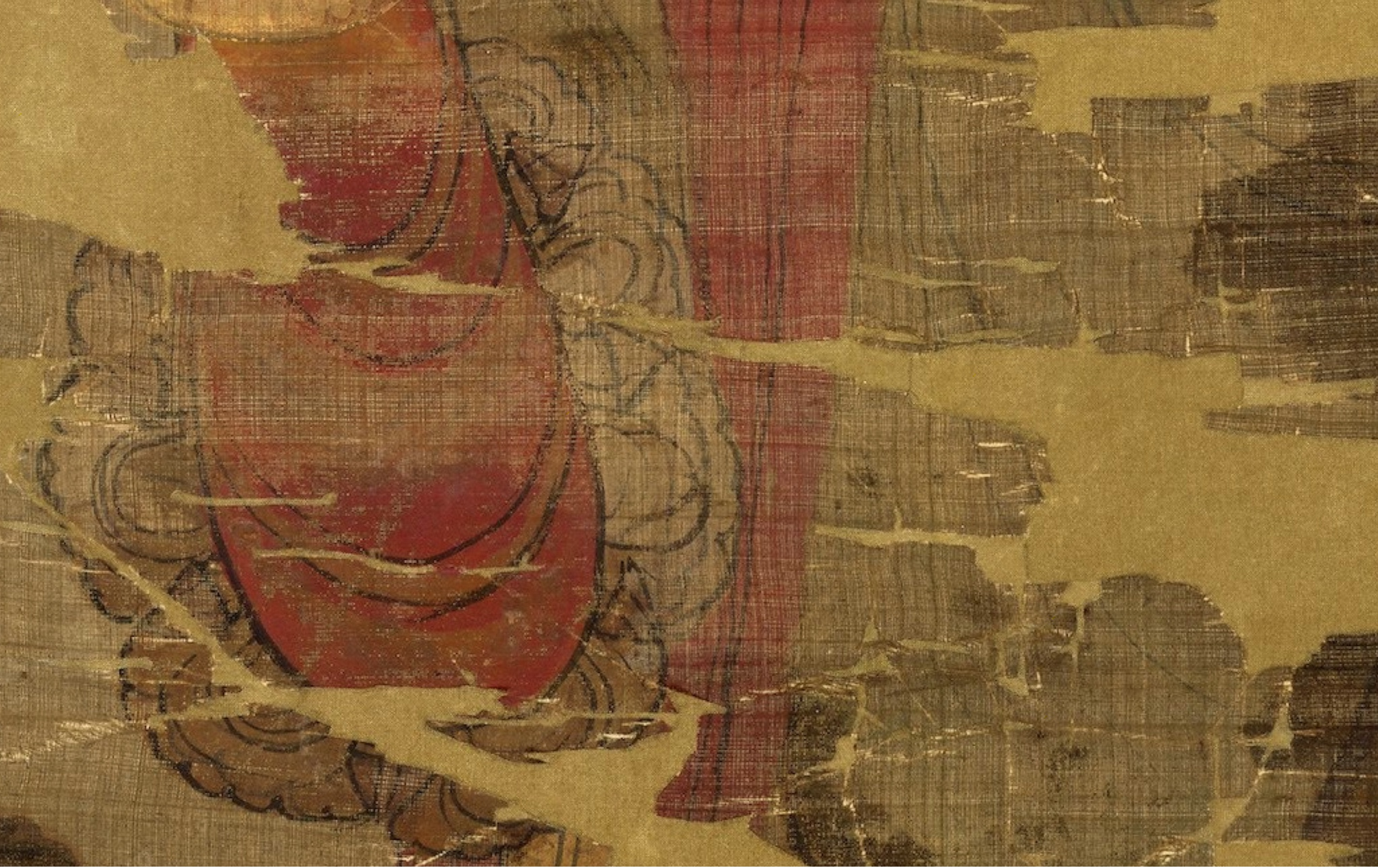
The sleeve ruffs

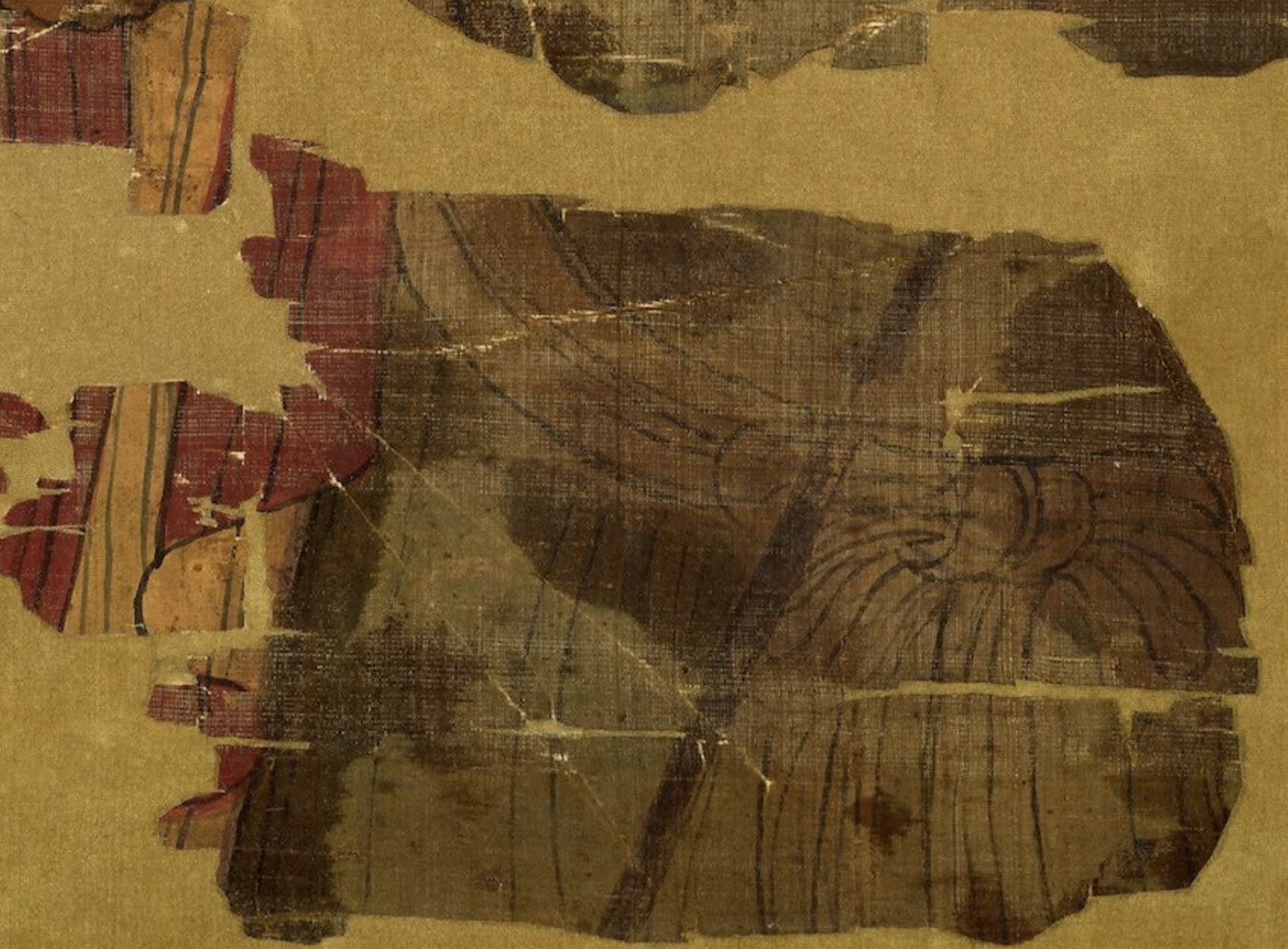
The sash with a bow knot.

== In popular culture ==
- The image appears on a missionary leaflet handed to Tan Qi (Rayzha Alimjan) by the Monk Jingde (Volker Helfrich) in the 20th episode of The Longest Day in Chang'an.

== See also ==
- Jingjiao Documents
- Nestorian cross
- Xi'an Stele
- Church of the East in China
- Church of the East in Sichuan
- Nestorian pillar of Luoyang
- Murals from the Christian temple at Qocho
- Manichaean Painting of the Buddha Jesus
- Sogdian Daēnās
- Ancient Arts of Central Asia
