= Serindia =

Central Asian region

The term Serindia combines Seres (China) and India to refer to the part of Asia also known as Xinjiang, Chinese Turkestan or High Asia. The term was popularized by Western archeologists seeking cultural connections to South Asia.

The art of this region is known as Serindian.

== See also ==
- China-India Relations
