= Murals from the Christian temple at Qocho =

Mural fragments from Xinjiang, China

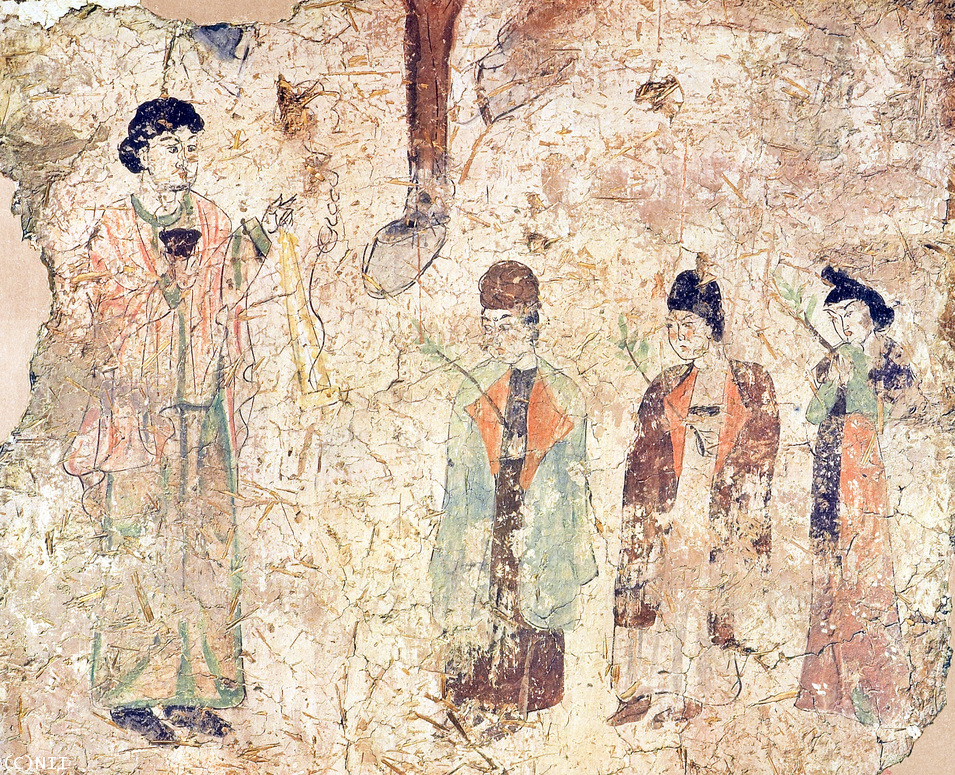
Palm Sunday

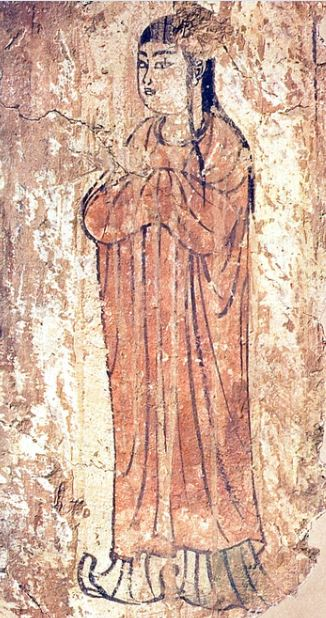
Repentance

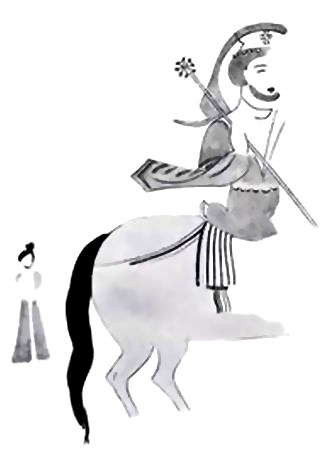
Entry into Jerusalem

The murals from the Christian temple at Qocho (German: Wandbilder aus einem christlichen Tempel, Chotscho) are three Church of the East mural fragments—Palm Sunday, Repentance and Entry into Jerusalem—discovered by the German Turpan expedition team, which was led by two German archaeologists, Albert Grünwedel and Albert von Le Coq, in the early 20th century.

These murals were painted in the 7th to 9th centuries, belonging to a ruined Church of the East church at Qocho, an ancient oasis city located in present-day Xinjiang, the westernmost region of modern China, once a capital of the Uyghur Kingdom of Qocho. The original Entry into Jerusalem is lost, there is only a copy of line drawing made by Grünwedel. The murals are preserved in the Museum of Asian Art in Dahlem, Berlin.

== Description ==
=== Palm Sunday ===
The mural measures 63 cm long and 70 cm wide, shows a man on the left of Near Eastern descent (or more specifically, an Iranian, according to Hans-Joachim Klimkeit), presumably a deacon or a priest. He has aquiline nose, the head surrounded by thick black curls is reminiscent of late antique representations. His clothing consists of a white vestment with a green collar, reaching to the feet, over which he wears a shorter garment of white with green cuffs. The plump feet are clad in rugged black shoes. In his left hand he wields a golden thurible, the smoke is represented by a swift upward wavy line that dissolves in spirals at the top. In his right hand he holds a black, bowl-like object, which might be a holy water vessel.

The three figures approaching from the right, two men and a woman with slightly bowed heads, are carrying what might be palm branches. The two men are wearing similar hats and coats with wide revers, hung round the shoulders like capes. The long, unicolour coat, which is brown in the first man, gray-blue in the second, and seems to be worn without a belt. The long sleeves of the coats hang empty and they hold their branches in one hand from within their coats. The first male figure wears a brown, turban-like headgear; the black hair is visible behind the left ear. The second male figure has a large, black and frustoconical hat worn on his head; on the feet both wear brownish coloured shoes.

The female figure on the right is dressed in banbi and ruqun, the traditional Chinese attires which consist of a short, long-sleeved green jacket, reaching only to the middle of the upper part of the body, and a long skirt, which covers the feet; a brown cloak or scarf covered, slightly thrown over the right half of the body from the shoulder to about half of the thigh, and the left shoulder to the chest. She wears green shoes with turned-up toes. The dense, black hair is folded at the apex to a spherical structure. The three worshippers may be compared with the figures of Uyghur princes and princesses holding flowers in the cave paintings at Bezeklik.

A donkey's hoof visible at the top of the scene is part of the lost fresco Entry into Jerusalem, this has led to the interpretation that the scene portrays a Palm Sunday rite. The Japanese professor Tōru Haneda also considers the mural to be a depiction of Palm Sunday; another Japanese scholar Daijirō Yoshimura (吉村大次郎) argues that the larger figure on the left representing Jesus Christ, the three figures on the right represent Saint Peter, Saint John and Mary Magdalene.

=== Repentance ===
This smaller painting measures 43 cm long and 21 cm wide. It represents a young woman in a state of repentance. She is in a long, reddish brown dress with wide, loose sleeves, which conceal the hands folded on the front body. The whitish undergarment reaches to the floor and reveals only the very large, upturned ends of the shoes, which rise up under the hem.

=== Entry into Jerusalem ===
This lost wall painting was sketched by Grünwedel in 1905. It depicts a bearded figure (Jesus) mounted on a donkey holding a processional cross with arms terminating in pearls and entering Jerusalem, (Note: According to Ken Parry, the figure riding on horseback; according to Meicun Lin and Szonja Buslig, what the figure mounted is a donkey.) with a female figure (believer) dressing in the Tang dynasty costume. The cross which the figure holding is similar to the processional cross depicted on a lost Manichean banner from Qocho. (Note: The Manichaean banner is a now lost painted and gilded silk hanging scroll, only surviving in fragments when discovered by the German Turpan expedition team. It depicts the Four Primary Prophets of Manichaeism around the Light Mind, one of which is a Jesus figure holding a processional cross.) The rider has a headdress with a cross set in it and he wears a short upper garment which appears to billow out.

== See also ==
- Bulayïq
- Ancient Arts of Central Asia
- Church of the East in China
- Church of the East in Sichuan
- Nestorian pillar of Luoyang
- Mogao Christian painting
