= Material religion =

Material religion is a framework used by scholars of religion to examine the interaction between religion and material culture. It focuses on the place of objects, images, spaces, and buildings in religious communities. The framework has been promoted by scholars such as Birgit Meyer, Sally M. Promey, S. Brent Plate, and David Morgan.

== Definition ==
Religion, being a prime human activity throughout history, is rooted in the body and in its sensual relations with the world. It always has been and always will be. We can make sense out of the senses. This is the first true thing we can say about religion, because it is also the first true thing we can say about being human. We are sentient beings, and religion is sensuous.

— Scholar of religion S. Brent Plate, 2014

S. Brent Plate, scholar of religion, explains that material religion "must be understood as deriving from rudimentary human experiences, from lived, embodied practices". He states that "to learn about religion we have to come to our senses. Literally. We have to begin to discover... that we cannot know the worlds of any other culture, let alone our own, unless we get inside the sensational operations of human bodies."

== History ==
In 2005, the peer-reviewed journal Material Religion was launched. In their editorial statement, the editors described the journal as "a new project in the study of religious images, objects, spaces, and material practices."

== Criticism ==
The anthropologist Simon Coleman suggests that the term "material religion" is tautological, in that "religion is inherently material in its very constitution."

Additionally, the scholars of religion Christopher R. Cotter and David G. Robertson suggest that the material religion framework could be an alternative means to explore religion, in contrast to the dominant world religions paradigm which they regard as problematic. According to them, material religion represents "phenomenology by stealth". Some scholars within the study of religion have criticised the material religion approach for often seeking to reintroduce the phenomenology of religion into the discipline.

== Sources ==
=== Bibliography ===
- Coleman, Simon (2009). "Material Religion: A Fruitful Tautology?". Material Religion. 5 (3): 359–360. doi:10.2752/175183409X12550007730101. S2CID 143003395.
- Cotter, Christopher; Robertson, David G. (2016). "Introduction: The World Religions Paradigm in Contemporary Religious Studies". In Christopher Cotter; David G. Robertson (eds.). After World Religions: Reconstructing Religious Studies. London and New York: Routledge. pp. 1–20. ISBN 978-1-138-91912-9.
- Editors (2005). "Editorial Statement". Material Religion. 1 (1): 4–8. doi:10.2752/174322005778054474. S2CID 218838130.
- Plate, S. Brent (2014). A History of Religion in 5½ Objects: Bringing the Spiritual to its Senses. Boston: Beacon Press. ISBN 978-0-8070-3311-1.
