= Serindian art =

Ancient Central Asian art

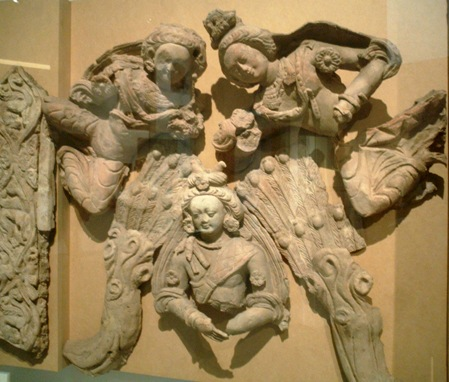
"Heroic gesture of the Bodhisattva", 6th-7th century terracotta, Tumxuk, Xinjiang, China

Serindian art is the art that developed from the 2nd through the 11th century C.E. in Serindia or Xinjiang, the western region of China that was within the cultural sphere of Central Asia during the time.

It derives from the Greco-Buddhist art of the Gandhara district of what is now Afghanistan and Pakistan. Gandharan sculpture combined Indian traditions with Greek influences.

Modern researchers hypothesize that Buddhist missionaries travelling on the Silk Road introduced this artistic influence, along with Buddhism itself, into Serindia, resulting in a style that is a hybrid of Greek, Chinese and Persian.

In modernity, Serindian art was rediscovered through the expeditions of Sir Aurel Stein in Central Asia at the beginning of the 20th century.

== Gallery ==
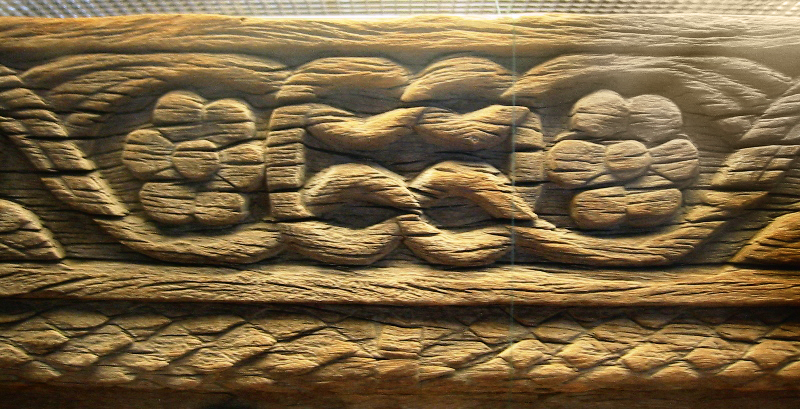
Carved wooden beam in Hellenistic style, 3rd-4th century

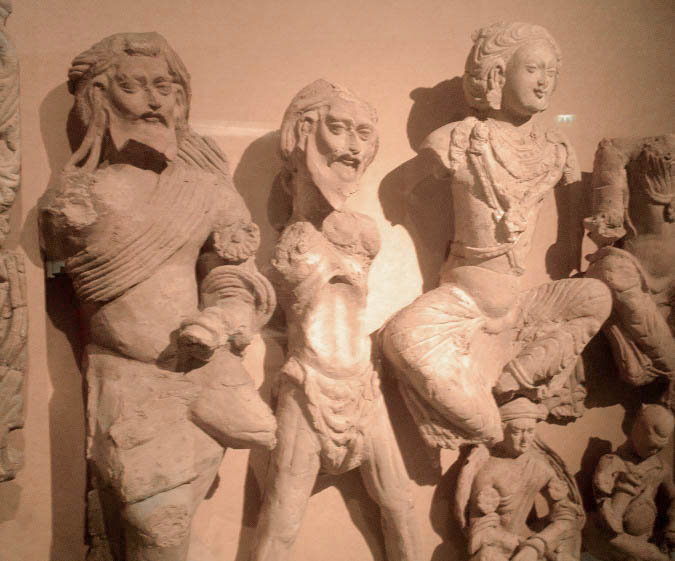
Serindian group, 6th-7th century terracotta, Tumshuq (Xinjiang)

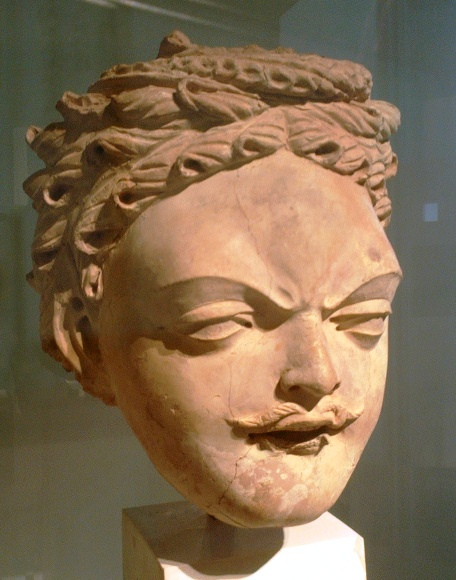
Head of a Serindian man, 6th-7th century terracotta, Tumshuq (Xinjiang)

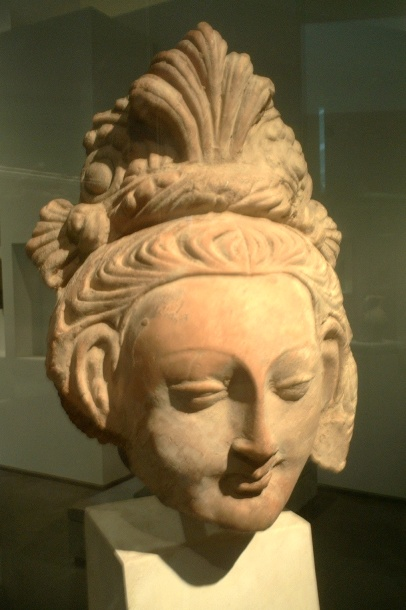
Head of a Serindian female Bodhisattva, 6th-7th century terracotta, Tumshuq (Xinjiang)

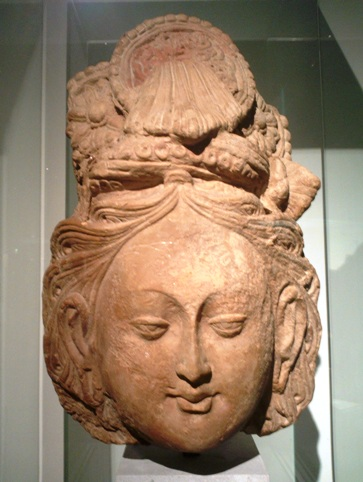
Serindian head, 6th-7th century terracotta, Tumshuq (Xinjiang)

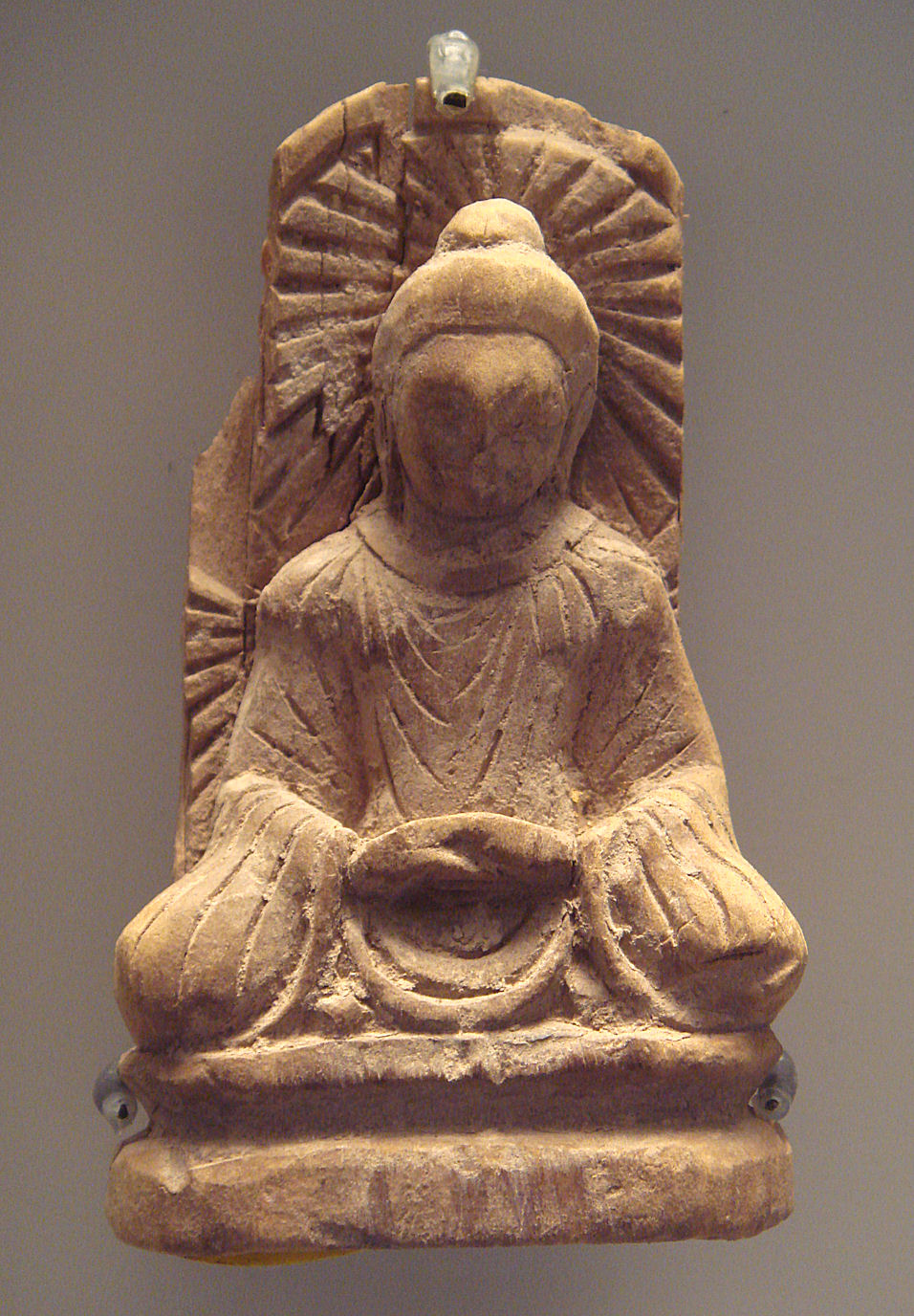
A Buddha statue from Tumshuq, Xinjiang. 5th century.

== See also ==
- Buddhist art
- Silk Road transmission of Buddhism
