= Seventh Day Baptist Church (Milton, Wisconsin) =

Historic church in Wisconsin, United States

- U.S. National Register of Historic Places
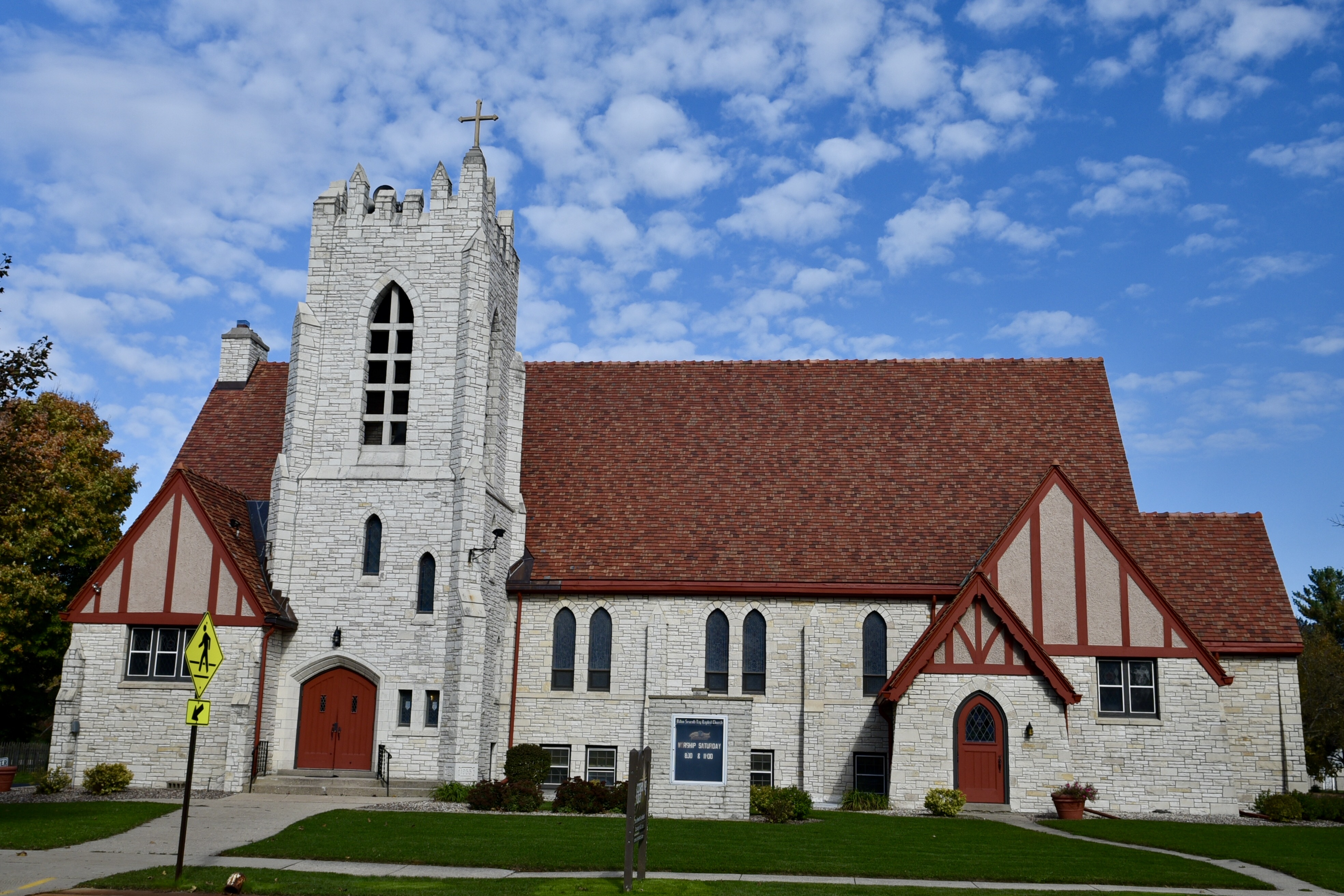
- Seventh Day Baptist Church
- Location: 720 E. Madison Ave. Milton, Wisconsin
- Built: 1934
- Architect: Hugo Haeuser
- Architectural style: Gothic Revival
- NRHP reference No.: 16000569
- Added to NRHP: August 22, 2016

The Seventh Day Baptist Church is a Gothic Revival-style church built in 1934 in Milton, Wisconsin. It was added to the National Register of Historic Places in 2016.

In the 1500s and 1600s, one of the issues driving Anabaptists to split from the Catholic Church and the early Protestant denominations was infant baptism. But the Anabaptists themselves divided over various issues. The Seventh Day Baptist Church was founded in 1650 in London, holding that the Sabbath should be observed on Saturday instead of Sunday - an interpretation of the Fourth Commandment.

In the late 1600s some of these Baptists from England migrated to the new world, and in the summer of 1838 some of their descendants arrived on the frontier of southern Wisconsin, staking claims near Prairie du Lac, which is now Milton. Henry Crandall and Joseph Goodrich went back east to bring their families while James Pierce stayed behind to watch their claims. After they returned, the families held their first Seventh Day Baptist meeting in 1839. They agreed to meet on Saturdays so that none would be tempted to Sunday worship by other Protestant settlers in the neighborhood.

In 1852 they constructed a church on the site of the current building, on land donated by Goodrich. The congregation grew and expanded the church building several times by 1882, and again in 1902. But in November 1932 their church burned, a total loss. Though this was in the Great Depression, the congregation decided to rebuild.

They hired Milwaukee architect Hugo C. Haeuser and he designed the new church in late Gothic Revival style, clad in limestone. Gothic Revival hallmarks are the pointed arches over many of the windows and doors and the buttresses. The stucco and half-timbering in the gable ends and the battlements on the square tower are more typical of Tudor Revival style, which was popular in the early 20th century. The type of limestone that veneers the walls is common for Haueser's churches, quarried near Lannon, Wisconsin northwest of Milwaukee. Inside, the lower level contains a fellowship hall, kitchen and classrooms. The upper level is the nave, with a vaulted ceiling supported by exposed beams.

Other than the addition of an education wing in 1984, the 1934 building is largely intact. It was listed on the NRHP as a distinctive example of Gothic Revival architecture in Milton and for its association with Haeuser, a master-architect of churches.
