= Milton Public Library =

- 42.773494°N 88.944043°W
- Location: Milton, Wisconsin
- Branch of: Arrowhead Library System
- Branches: 1

Collection
- Size: 28,321 (2015)

Access and use
- Circulation: 96,963 (2015)
- Population served: 5,519 (2016)
- Members: 8,163 (2015)

Other information
- Budget: $316,876 (2015)
- Director: Ashlee Kunkel
- Employees: 6
- Website: www.miltonpubliclibrary.org

The Milton Public Library is located in Milton, Wisconsin. It is one of the seven libraries that make up the Arrowhead Library System, which also includes the libraries of Janesville, Edgerton, Clinton, Evansville, Beloit, and Orfordville. The library occupies the first floor of the Shaw Municipal Building.

The mission of the Milton Public Library is to provide quality materials and services which fulfill educational, informational, cultural, and recreational needs of the entire community in an atmosphere that is welcoming, respectful, and businesslike. The library also contains a MakerSpace called The SPARK.

== History ==
The history of the current public library goes back to when the City of Milton was two towns: Milton and Milton Junction. Each town, originally, had its own library.

=== Library of Milton (Village) ===
The first library in Milton was part of Milton College, which was founded in 1844. Individual libraries from various societies, that contributed to both community and student life, made up the first library at Milton College. A gift of books and $1,000 from Dr. Daniel C. Babcock further helped to establish the library. Named after Babcock, the Daniel Babcock Library was initially located on the first floor of Main Hall and further funding issued from Babcock's will continued to support the library.

On November 12, 1904, The Woman's Village Improvement Club, organized by Mrs. J.G. Carr, set out to raise funding for Whitford Memorial Hall. They ultimately raised over $900, and when the hall was completed around 1907, the library was relocated to the new building.

By 1916, the library held about 10,000 volumes

In 1967, the library moved from Whitford Hall to the Shaw Memorial Library, which was dedicated to Dr. Edwin Ben Shaw and Professor Leland C. Shaw, father and son professors of the college.

The Shaw Memorial Library ceased operations when the Milton College closed in 1982.

=== Library of Milton Junction ===
The Ladies Club of Milton Junction was organized on September 24, 1904, for the purpose of systematic study. Soon known as the Fortnightly Club, they held their first literary meeting on October 21, 1904 at 3:30 p.m. Two years after its creation, on May 18, 1906, the club voted to pursue the project of organizing a public library. In October of that year, they purchased $10 worth of books to be used for the following year's literary discussions. But most importantly, the books were bought with the hope that they might serve as a nucleus for a public library. In early November, the ladies voted to sponsor a lecture course to raise funds for more books.

The first library occupied a small space in a bakery operated by Russell Frink, which was located on the first floor of P. of H. Hall. Mrs. F.R. Morris was the first librarian. The library was moved several times before occupying a room in the Milton Junction grade school. It was opened two afternoons a week, and the Fortnightly Club used its own funds to equip the room. The library, however, was forced to close for a number of reasons. The main reason being that the school itself was becoming too crowded, and the library needed to be used for additional classroom space. Additionally, questions arose concerning who was responsible for financing the library with the incorporation of the village of Milton Junction within the Town of Milton. At its closing, according to an article printed at the time, "Miss Mildred Conkey, who has served as librarian, and a few volunteers packed the 2,000 volumes and stored them in the basement of the grade school. It is the fond hope of those most interested in the continuance of the library for the village and the township and the grade school, that a place can be found after the smoke of incorporation settles this fall." In September 1952, it moved to the Municipal Building on First Street.

On April 10, 1967, the Fortnightly Club voted to relinquish all books and properties to the Village of Milton Junction, therefore making it a public library. With this move, the library became eligible for funds from Rock County, Wisconsin.

In August 1969, the library was moved to 501 Vernal Avenue. It was opened Monday, Wednesday, and Friday from 6:30 to 8:20 p.m. and on Saturdays from 2 to 5 p.m. Furthermore, the library began to issue library cards that would be honored at any library in Rock County. Mrs. Russell Burdick was head librarian.

=== The two merge ===
On April 18, 1967, Milton and Milton Junction merged.

In 1982, it became clear that the library needed more space. From 1969 to 1982, the number of cardholders increased 1800%, circulation had increased 954%, and the hours had tripled. The then-empty Shaw Memorial College building was seriously considered, as it had the space for library growth.

In July 1982, the city put a bid in for the 60,000+ books that were previously a part of the college library.

It wasn't until 1985 that the deed for the Shaw Library was turned over to the city, and in 1986, the Shaw Memorial Community Center was dedicated, which now houses the city's library.
