= James C. Bartholf =

American politician

James C. Bartholf (November 28, 1858 – March 12, 1936) was an American newspaper editor, journalist, and politician.

Born in Whitewater, Walworth County, Wisconsin, Bartholf went to Battle Creek College. He then graduated from Milton College in 1881. He was principal of the Milton Junction, Wisconsin grade school in 1881. Bartholf was a journalist, editor, and publisher of the Milton Telephone newspaper in Milton, Wisconsin and other publications. In 1885 and 1887, Bartholf served in the Wisconsin State Assembly as a Republican. Later, Bartholf was involved in the Chatauqua movement and the Anti-Saloon League in Wisconsin and other states. Bartholf died at his daughter's house, in Chicago, Illinois after a long illness.
