= Huizhong Church, Shanghai =

Huizhong Church
- 惠中堂
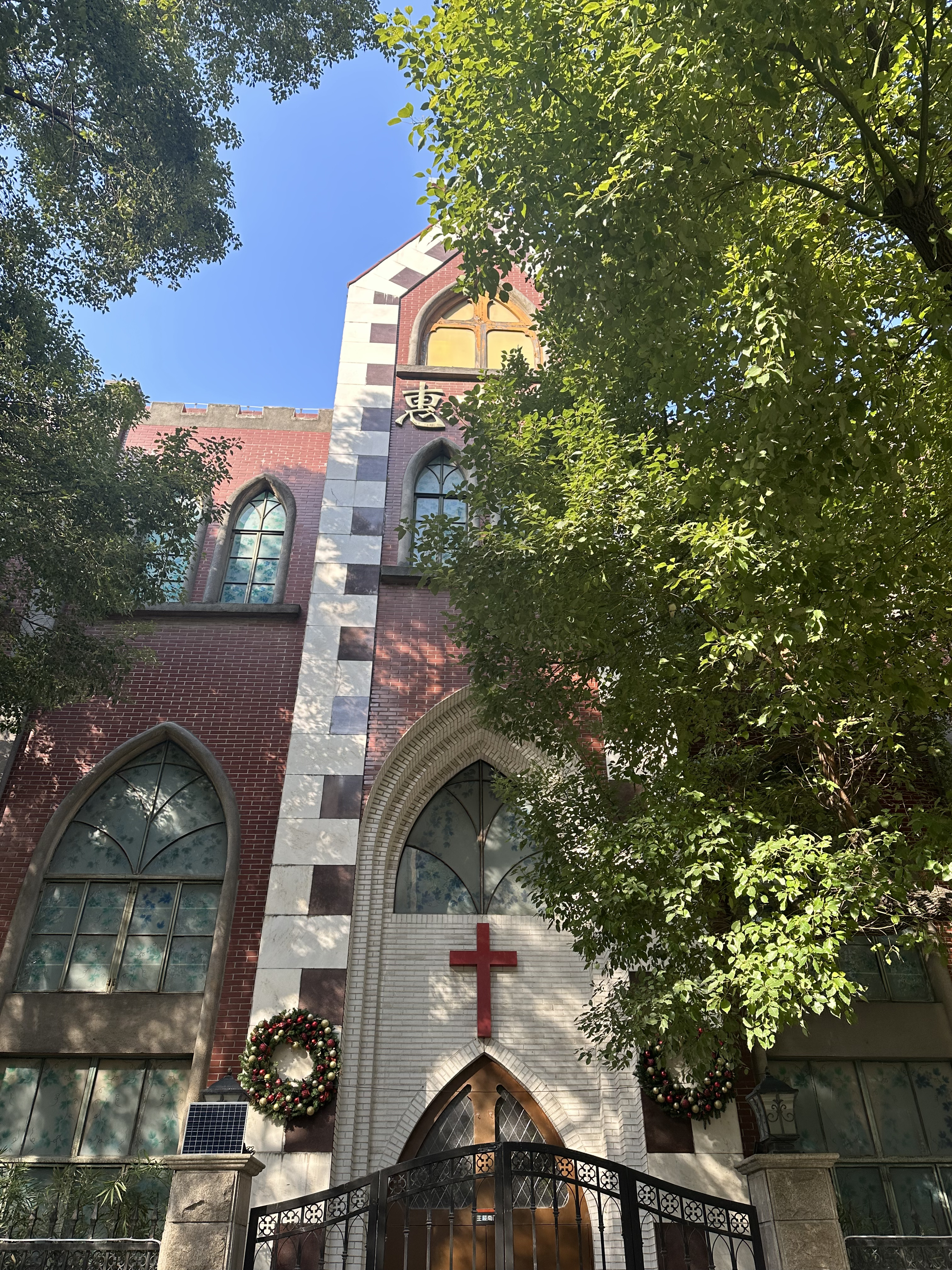
- The facade of Huizhong Church, showing the characters "惠中"
- Huizhong Church
- 31°12′41″N 121°28′52″E
- Address: 38-40 Xujiahui Rd, Huangpu District, Shanghai
- Country: China
- Denomination: Seventh Day Baptist (1904–1958); Protestant (1958–)

History
- Status: Church
- Founded: 1904

Architecture
- Functional status: Active
- Completed: 1904, 1996 (rebuilt)

Huizhong Church (Chinese: 惠中堂; pinyin: Huìzhōng táng) is a Protestant Christian place of worship in Huangpu, Shanghai. Originally founded by the Seventh Day Baptist Mission in 1904, it jointed general Protestant worship in 1958. It collapsed after the Cultural Revolution and was rebuilt in 1996.

== Overview ==
The church was founded by Seventh Day Baptist missionaries in 1904, the 30th year of the Guangxu era. In 1958, the church joined the non-denominational joint Protestant worship in Shanghai. At the time, the church was headed by Zhuang Shulian (Chinese: 庄叔廉).

During the Cultural Revolution (1966–1976), all church activities in Shanghai halted, and Red Guard students of Wu'ai School took over the church site. The church building collapsed after the Cultural Revolution, and was rebuilt in 1996. The rebuilding completed in 1997. The rebuilt structure has three and a half floors. The first and second floors, which can contain about 500 people, are for worship services. The third floor has an occupancy of 300 people, and can also be used for worship services. In October 2018, the church hosted a half-day bazaar to raise funds for poor and sick children.

== Gallery ==
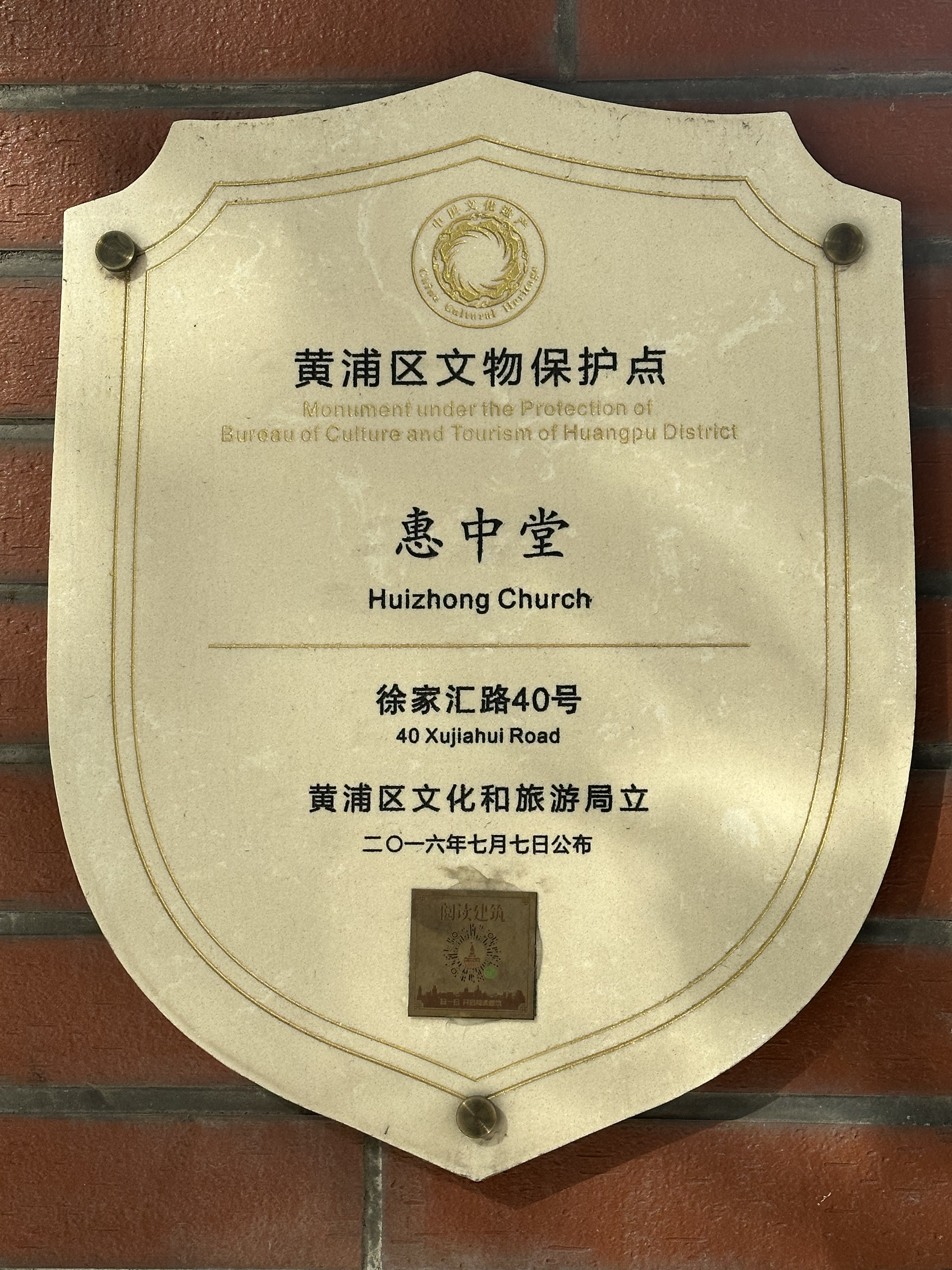
The plaque designating the church to be a monument under protection

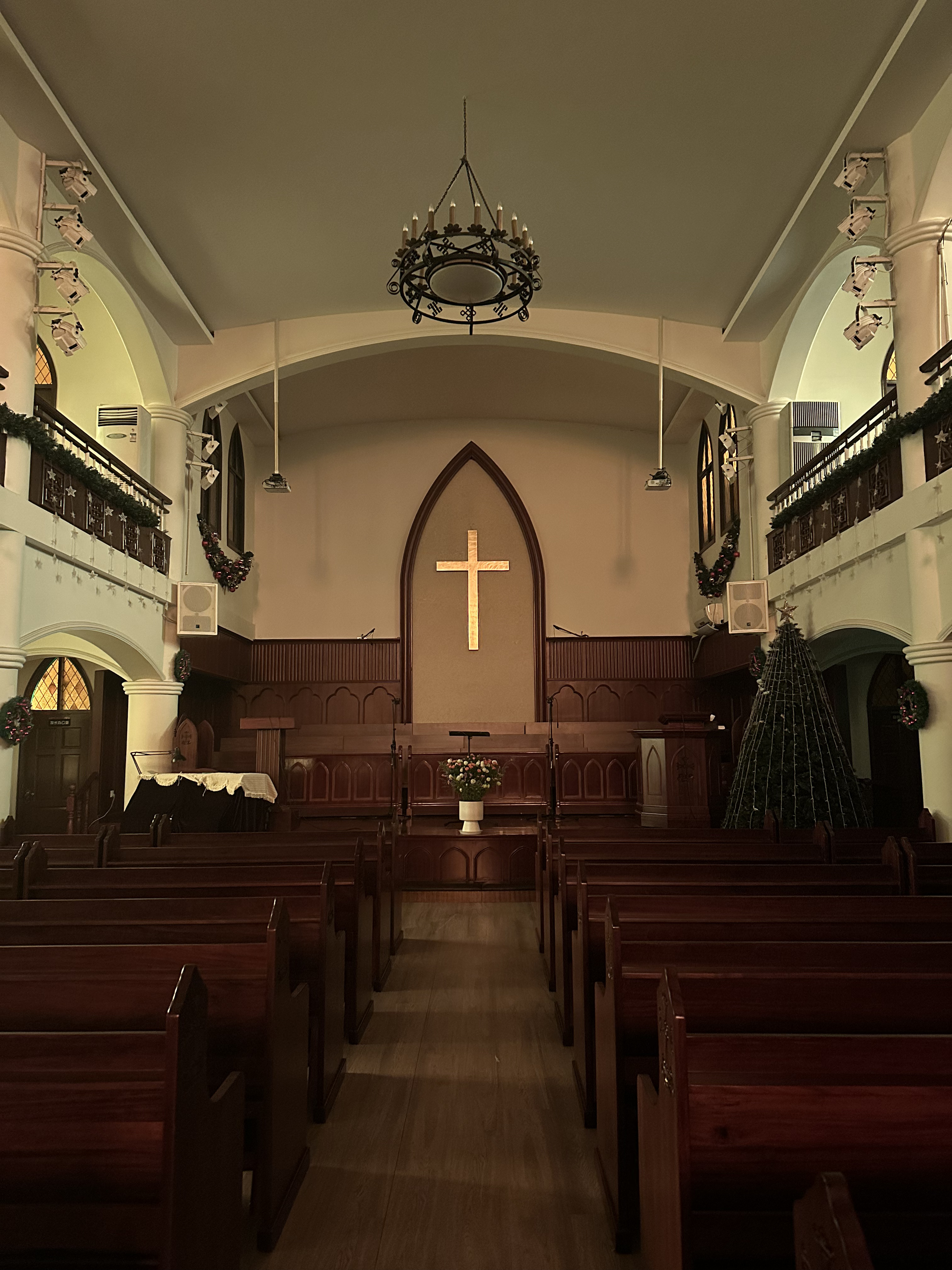
The nave of the church

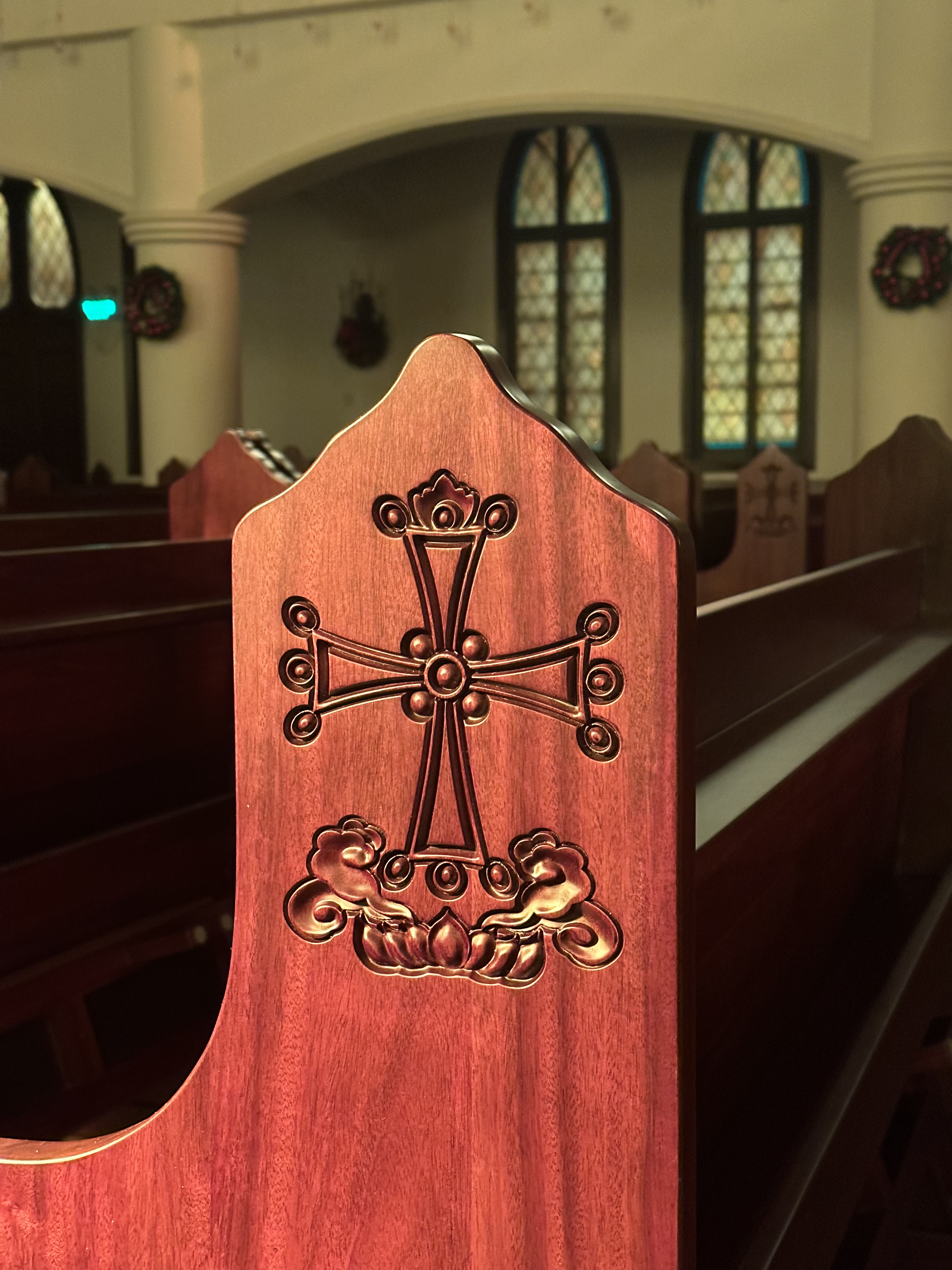
The pews of the church feature a Nestorian cross

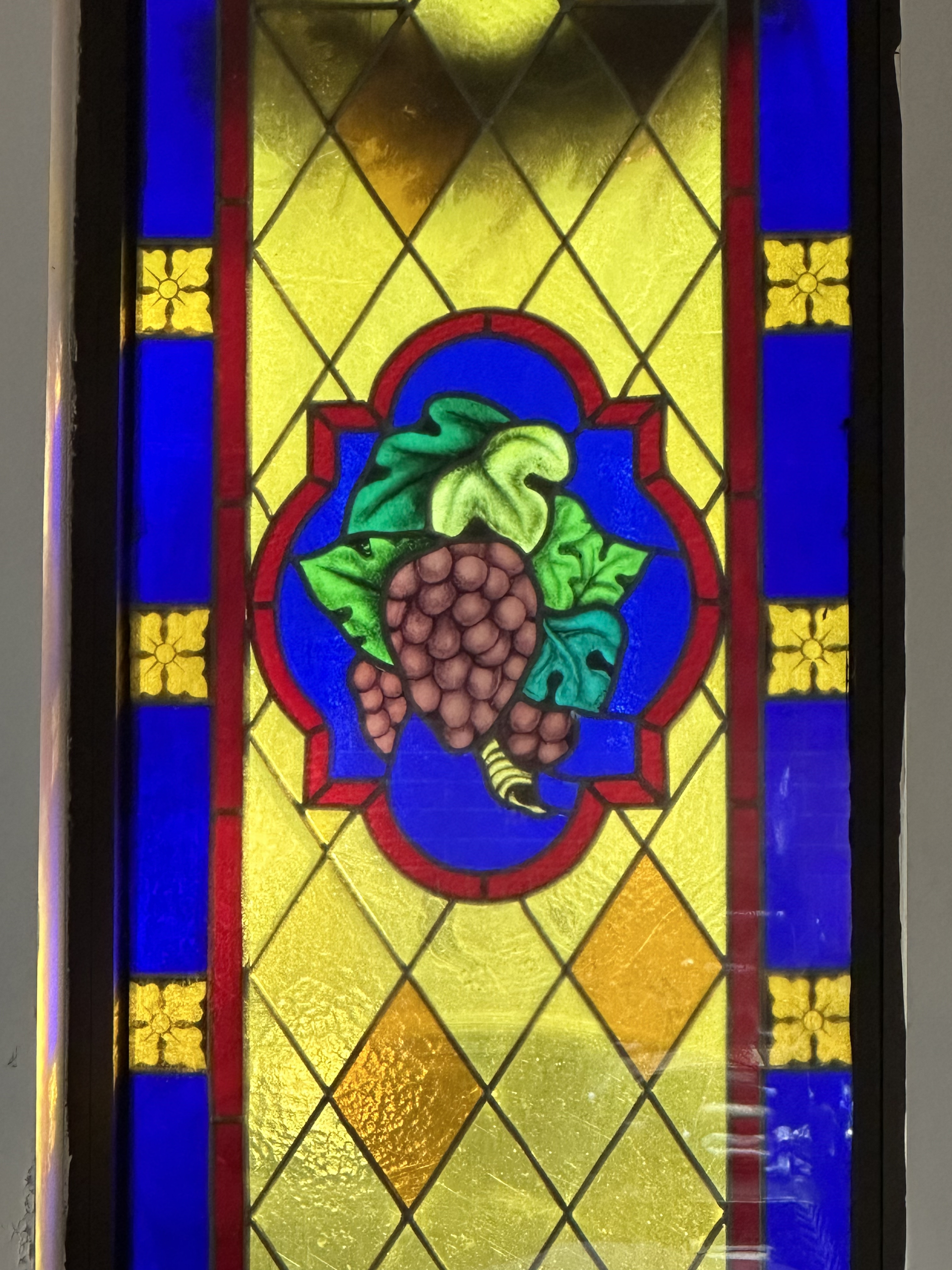
The stained glass window of the church

== See also ==
- All Saints, Shanghai – 1925 church also in Huangpu District
