= Denson =

Denson is a surname. Notable people with the surname include:

- Abby Denson, American comic artist
- Al Denson (American football), American footballer
- Al Denson, American musician
- Amy Denson (born 1984), American basketball player
- Autry Denson, American footballer
- Beasley Denson, Native American tribal chief
- Brandon Denson, American football player
- Damon Denson, American footballer
- David Denson, American baseball player
- Drew Denson, American baseball player
- ED Denson, American record producer
- G. Roger Denson, American art critic
- Henry Denny Denson, Irish-born Canadian judge
- Karl Denson, American musician
- Kate Denson, fictional character in the 2016 multiplayer horror game Dead by Daylight
- Kerry G. Denson, United States Army general
- Moses Denson, American footballer
- Rod Denson, American radio and television personality
- Seaborn McDaniel Denson, American musician
- Thomas Jackson Denson, American musician
- Vin Denson, English cyclist
- William D. Denson, American lawyer and military prosecutor
- William Henry Denson, American politician
- Willie Denson, American singer and songwriter

== See also ==
- Denson, Ohio, a community in the United States
- Denson Devadas, Indian footballer
- Denson Seamount, submarine volcano
- Mount Denson, Nova Scotia, community in Nova Scotia, Canada
