= Christopher J. Rollis =

American politician

Christopher Rollis

Member of the Wisconsin State Assembly
- In office 1884–1886

Personal details
- Born: January 21, 1858 Norway
- Died: August 15, 1930 (aged 77) Stoughton, Wisconsin, U.S.
- Education: Milton College

Military service
- Branch/service: United States Army
- Battles/wars: Spanish–American War

Christopher J. "Cap" Rollis (January 21, 1858 – August 15, 1930) was an American newspaper editor and politician who served as a member of the Wisconsin State Assembly from 1884 to 1886.

== Early life and education ==
Born in Norway, Rollis emigrated with his parents to the United States in 1862. He went to Albion Academy and Normal Institute in Dane County before attending Milton College in Rock County, Wisconsin.

== Career ==
Rollis lived in the village of Oregon, Wisconsin. Rollis was the publisher and editor of the Oregon Observer and later the Stoughton Courier Hub, both in Dane County, Wisconsin. Rollis served as a trustee of the village of Oregon. In 1884 he married Edna M. Tipple, with whom he had two sons. In 1885, Rollis served in the Wisconsin State Assembly as a Republican representative. He served in the United States Army during the Spanish–American War. He was commissioned as a captain in the 34th US Infantry and served in the Philippines. He also served in France during the First World War.

== Death ==
In 1930, Rollis died of a heart attack at his home in Stoughton, Wisconsin. He is buried in Riverside Cemetery in Stoughton.
