= Nestorian cross =

Cross associated with the Church of the East

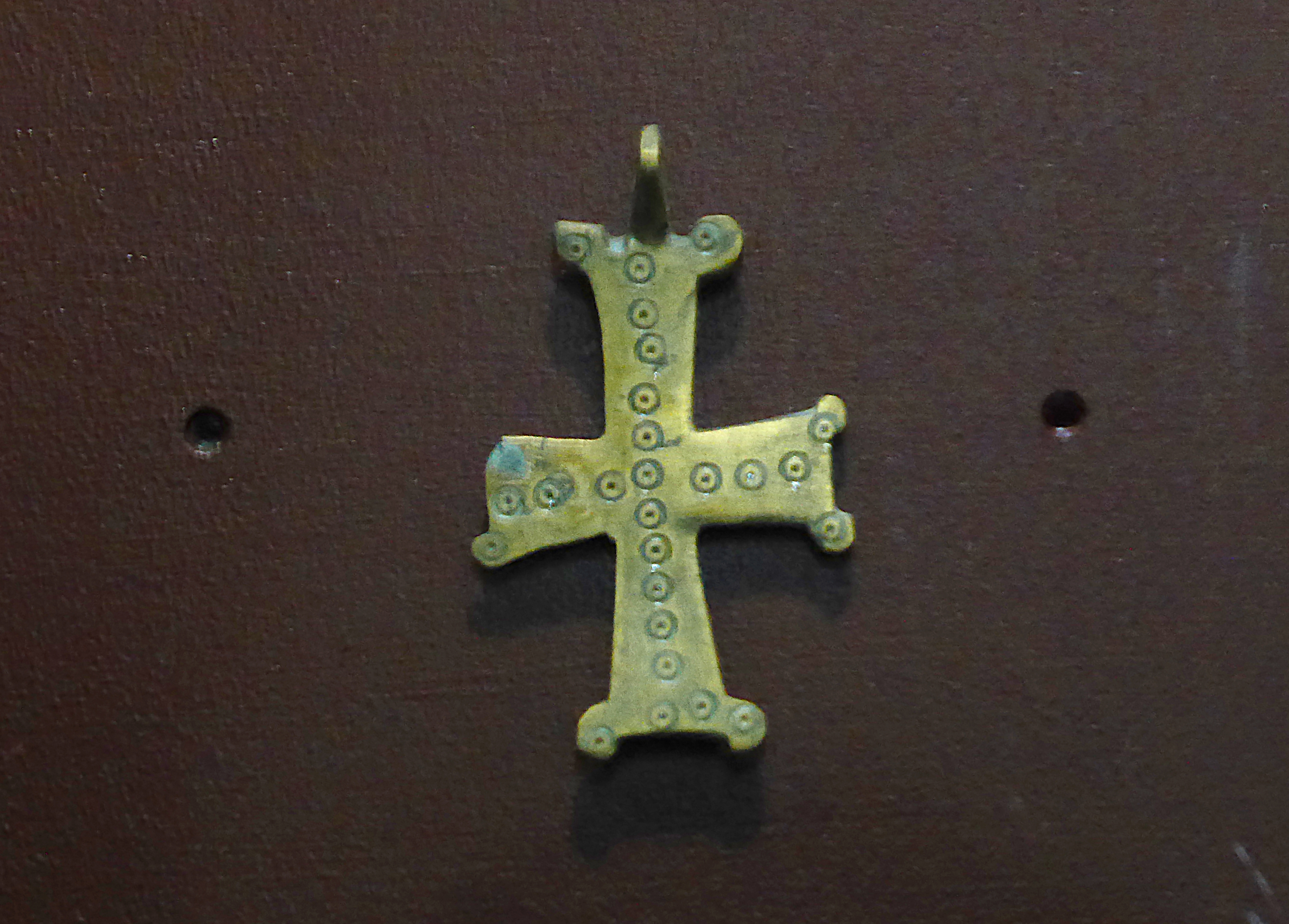
Nestorian cross in Mary Museum, Turkmenistan

The Nestorian cross is associated with the Church of the East. It is composed of a cross similar to the Maltese cross, with four arms of roughly equal length which narrow in width towards the center of the cross. In Eastern Christian art in China, these crosses are sometimes simplified and depicted as resting on a lotus flower or on a stylized cloud.

== Cross of the Assyrian Church of the East ==
The cross of the Assyrian Church of the East has three dots lining the left cross-bar, three dots lining the right cross-bar, two dots lining the top bar, and one dot on the bottom bar. These nine dots represent the nine orders of ministry within the church. Between the two dots on the top bar is a crown with three prongs, representing the Trinity.

== Gallery ==
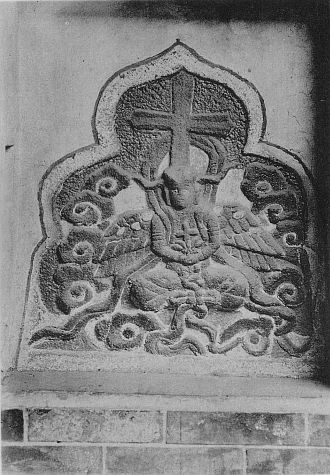
Nestorian headstone

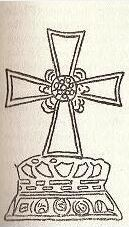
Nestorian cross found in China

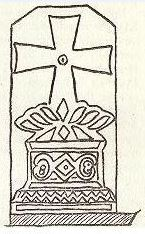
Nestorian cross found in China

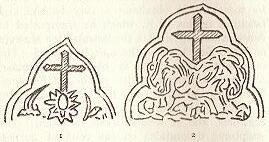
Two Nestorian crosses found in China

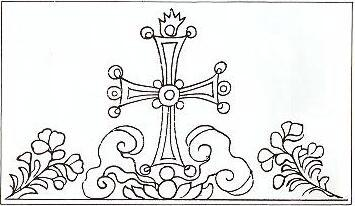
The cross from the Nestorian Stele

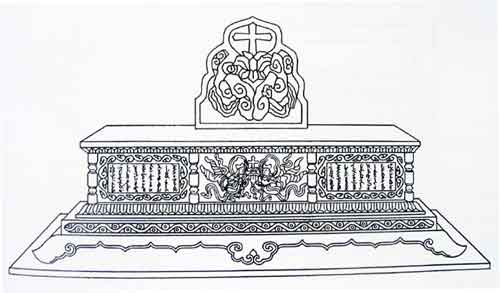
Nestorian altar-type grave monument shows a stone grave marker with cross symbol on its flat top

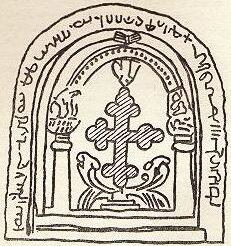
Saint Thomas Christian cross from India

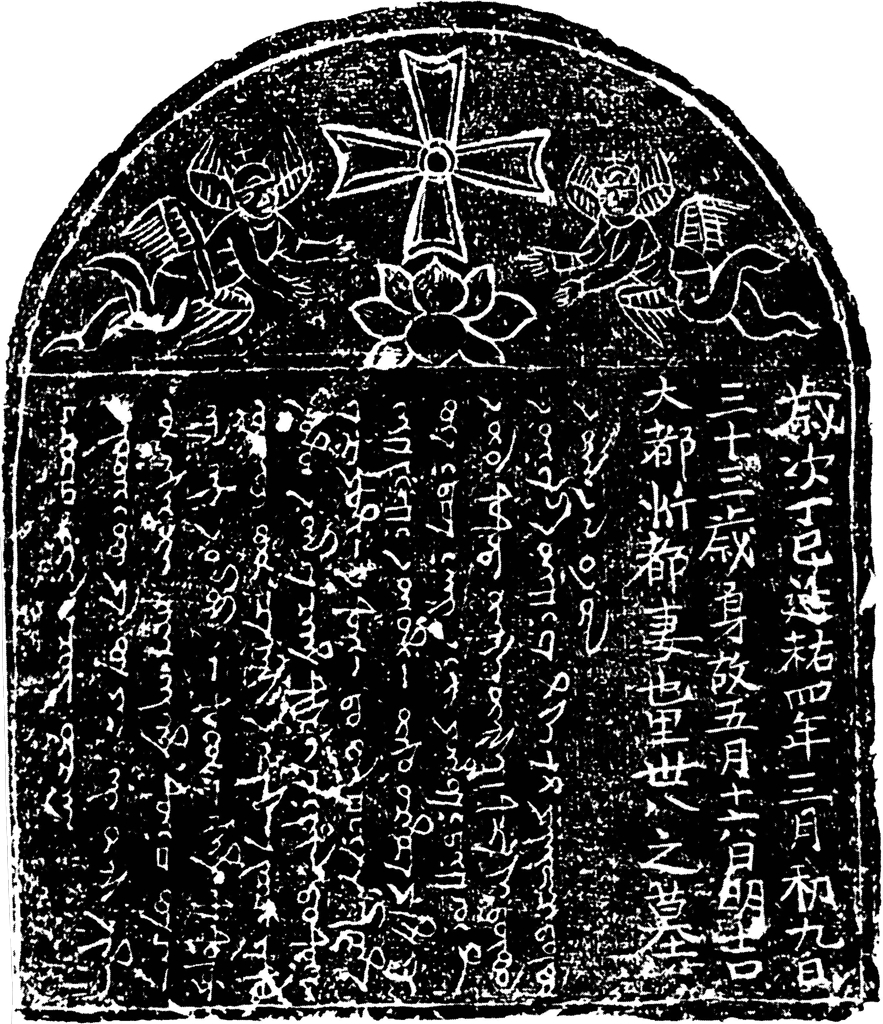
Nestorian headstone rubbing with cross-on-lotus symbol

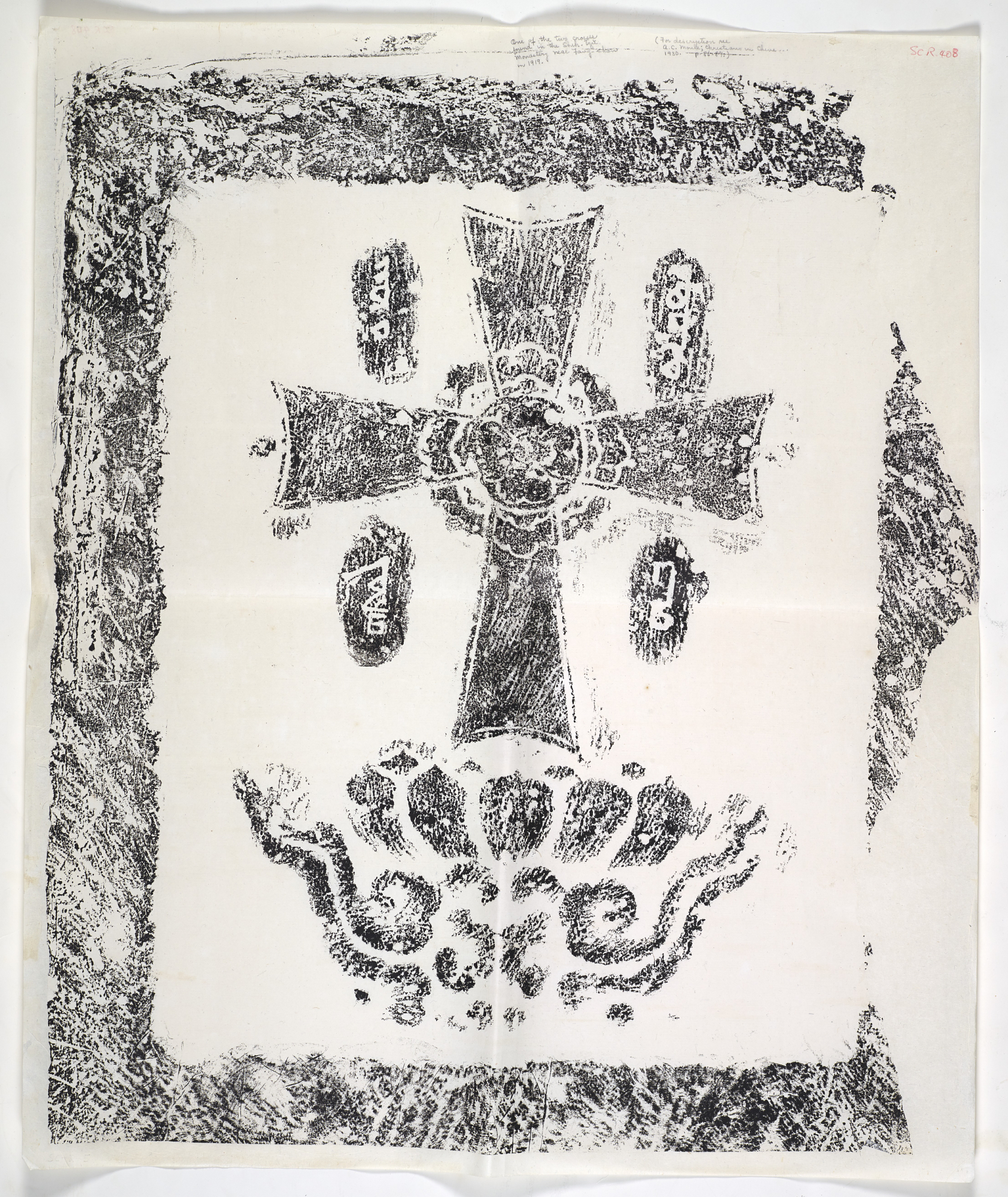
Rubbing of a Nestorian cross at the Cross Temple, Fangshan

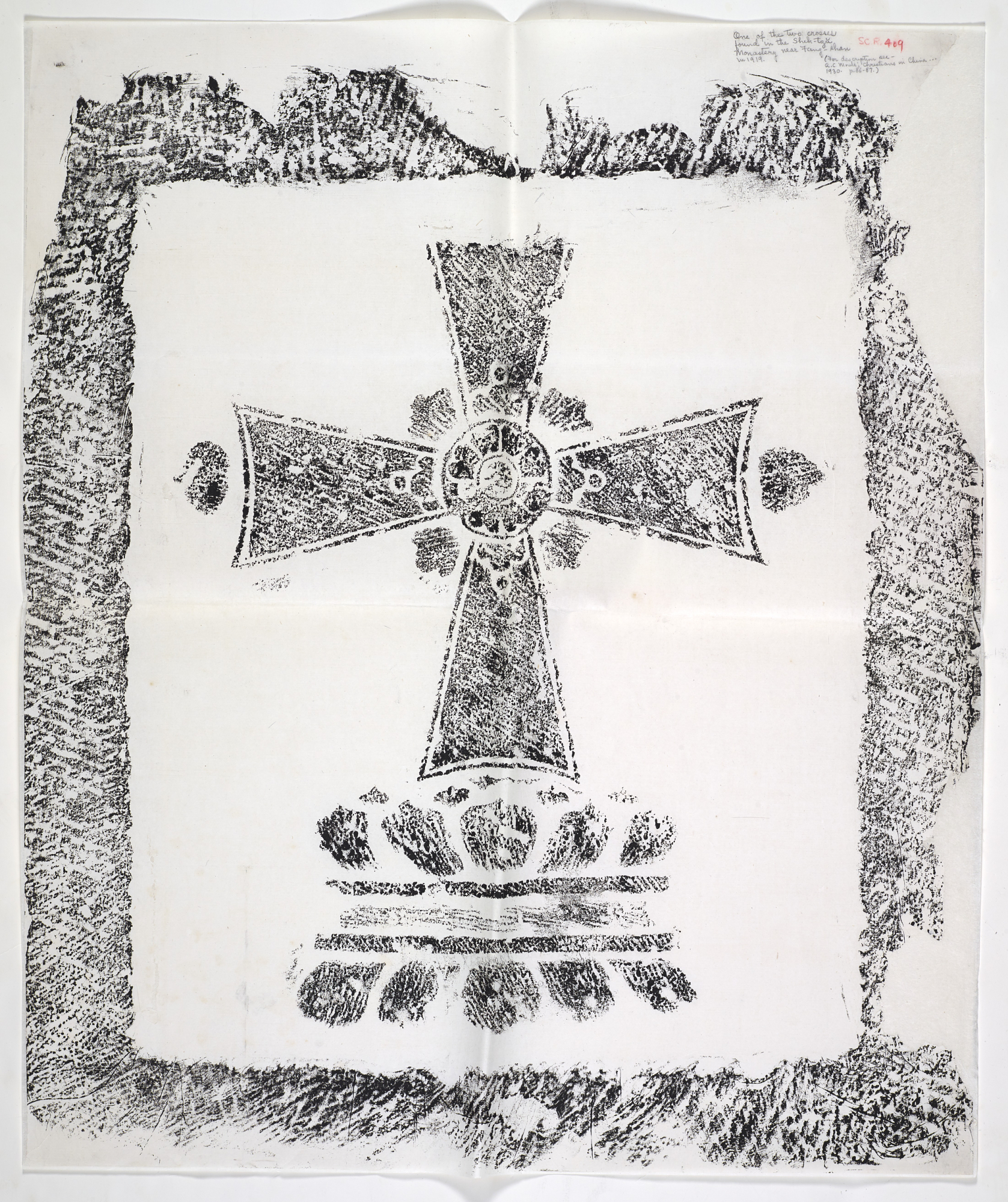
Rubbing of a Nestorian cross at the Cross Temple, Fangshan

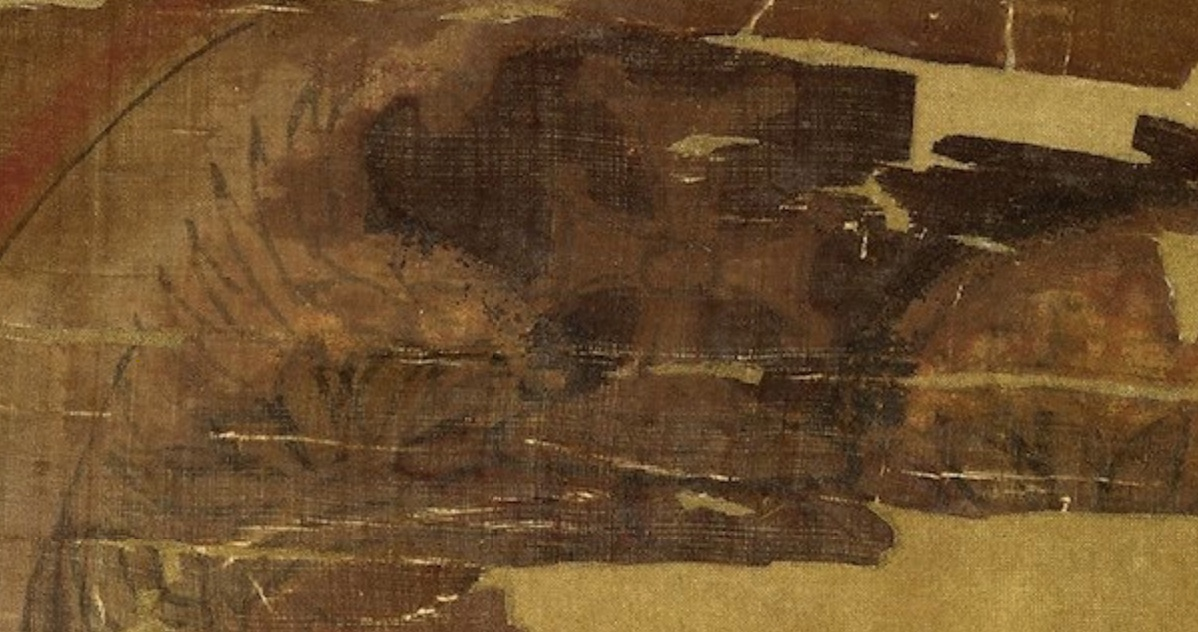
Cross in the headdress of a Christian figure, detail of the Mogao Christian painting, 9th century.

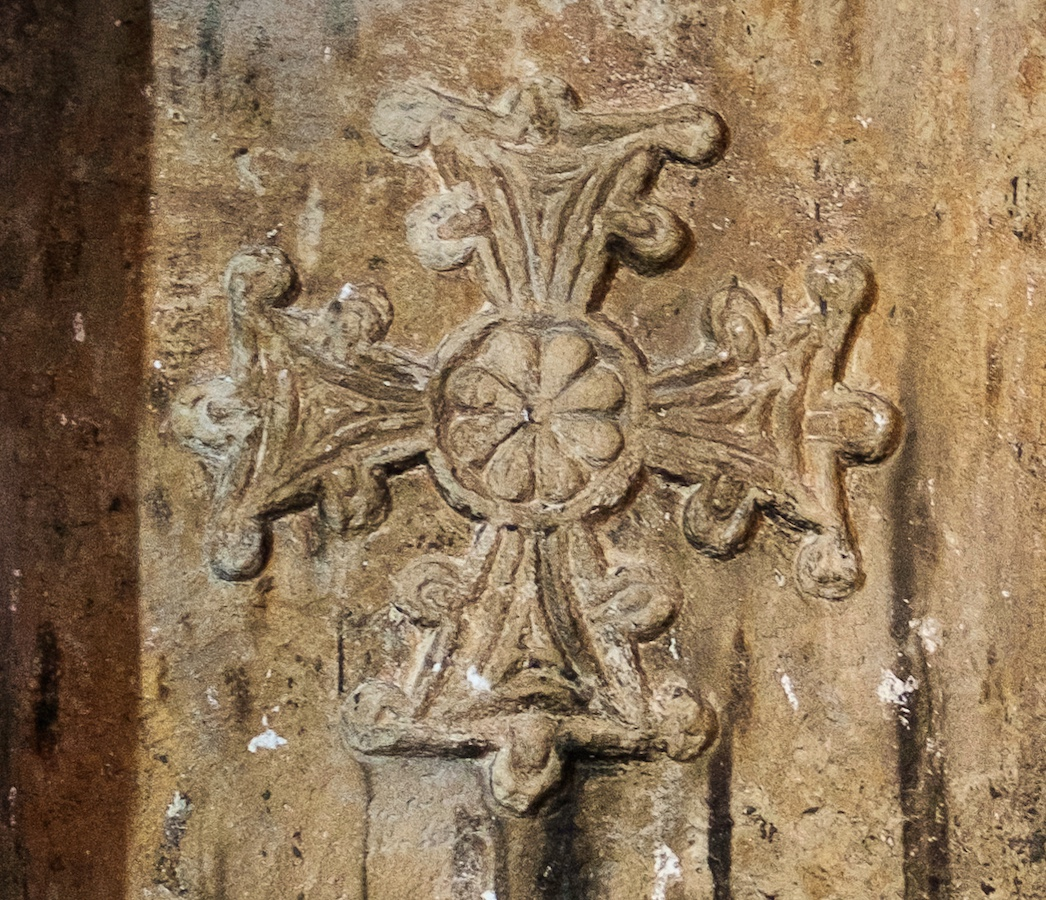
Relief of a cross at Rabban Hormizd Monastery

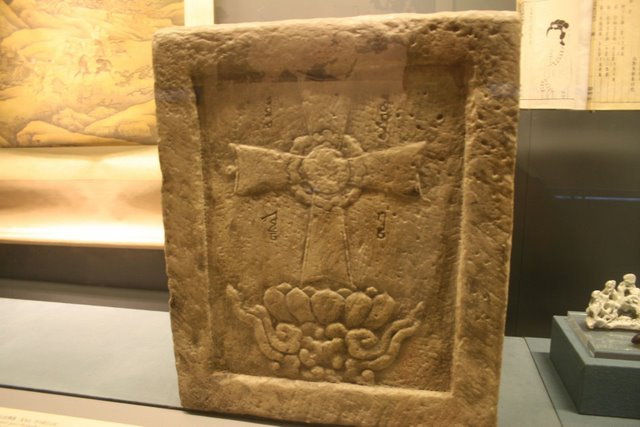
Yuan dynasty stone-carved Nestorian cross from Cross Temple, Fangshan, Beijing (then called Khanbaliq)

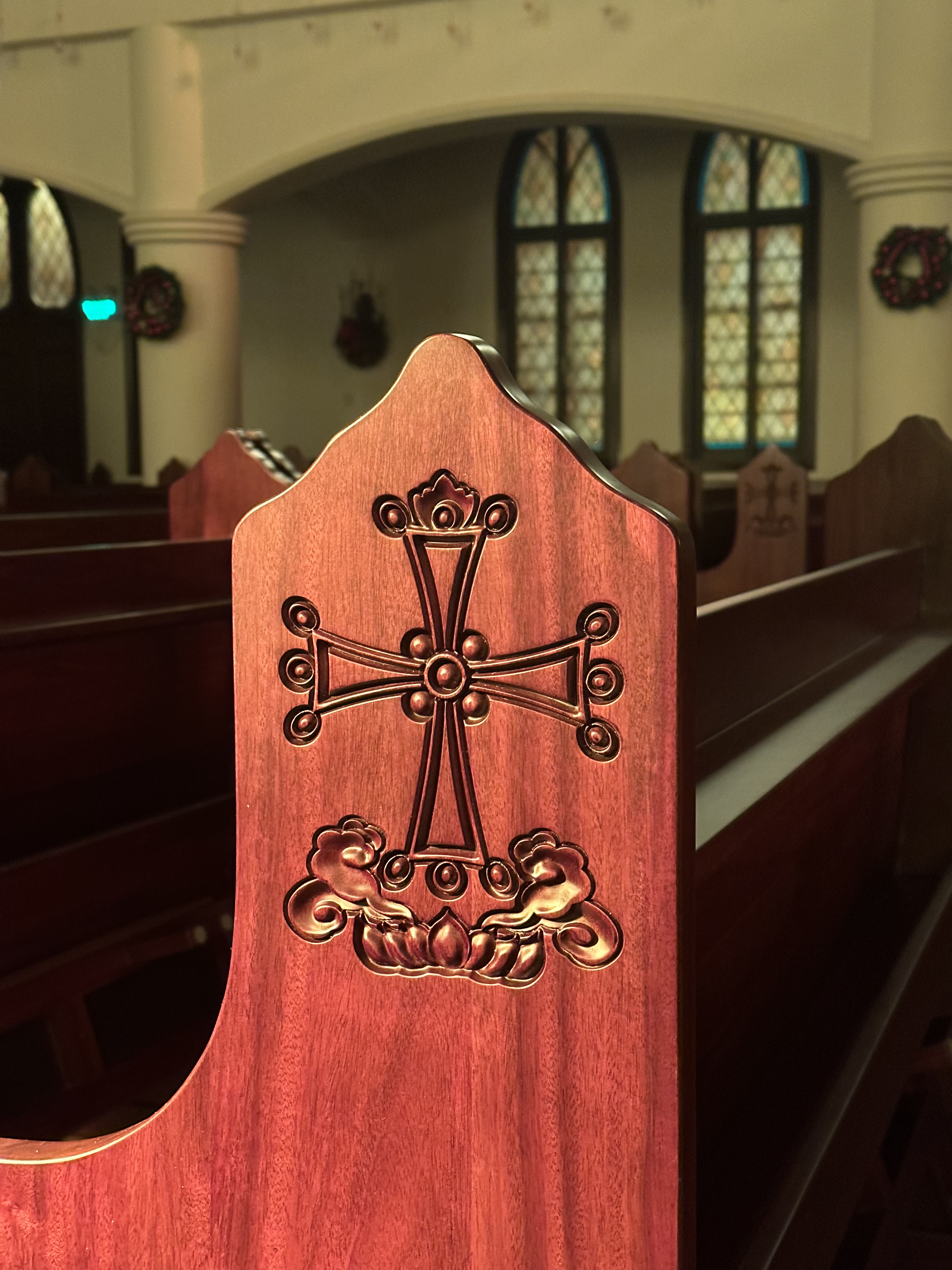
Modern rendition of the Nestorian Cross at Huizhong Church, Shanghai
