= Joseph Goodrich =

American politician

Joseph Goodrich (May 12, 1800 – October 9, 1867) was an American pioneer, businessman, and politician.

Born in Hancock, Massachusetts, Goodrich moved to Stephentown, New York, in 1812, to live with an uncle where he was involved with farming and was a member of the Seventh Day Baptist Church. In 1819, Goodrich moved to Alfred, New York where he had a sawmill, store, and hotel. Then in 1839, Goodrich and his family moved to Prairie du Lac, Wisconsin Territory. There he founded the village of Milton, Wisconsin and Milton College. He served in the Wisconsin State Assembly in 1855 as a Republican. In Milton, Wisconsin, Goodrich built the Milton House. Goodrich was a supporter of the abolitionist movement and used his house for the Underground Railroad.
