= Ellsworth Snyder =

American classical composer

Ellsworth Snyder (May 13, 1931 – August 11, 2005) was an American abstract painter, professional pianist, conductor and scholar. He was known as a champion of avant-garde art and music and is associated with composer John Cage and the Fluxus art movement. He preferred that his name be spelled ellsworth snyder, using all lower-case letters.

== As pianist and music scholar ==
Snyder's interest in the avant-garde art movement developed out his formal training in classical music. A native of Springfield, Ohio, Snyder attended The Cincinnati Conservatory of Music (now the College-Conservatory of Music of the University of Cincinnati) where he studied with noted pianist Robert Goldsand and the Austro-Hungarian pianist and composer Jenő Takács while earning both his bachelor's and master's degrees. He also took several classes in Cincinnati with the American musicologist and composer Charles Hamm, who subsequently wrote several piano pieces for Snyder. In 1960 Snyder accepted a position as music instructor at Newcomb College of Tulane University in New Orleans where he began an experimental new music series titled "You've never heard anything like it". The programs ranged from the twelve-tone compositions of Schoenberg to Fluxus happenings. One of these happenings in 1960 consisted of a performer crushing a light bulb into a frying pan. Snyder developed a reputation for bringing to his avant-garde performances the same seriousness and sensitivity to tone, timing and clarity that he did to traditional classical music.

It was his interest in contemporary music that led to a decisive meeting with John Cage in 1960. The two men became lifelong friends and professional colleagues. In 1964 Snyder moved to Madison, Wisconsin, where he wrote the first doctoral dissertation ever written on John Cage, for the University of Wisconsin–Madison. Snyder included compositions by Cage in the standard repertoire of music that he performed both in the United States and internationally including the album of new music that he recorded for Advance Records in 1974 and a recital that he gave at Lincoln Center's Alice Tully Hall in 1977. He also published two interviews with John Cage, one in 1985 and the other in 1990. In 1990 John Cage composed a piece for piano for Snyder called One5, for ellsworth, which Snyder premiered on an all-Cage program in Madison in 1991. Cage was in attendance for the performance, one year before his own death at age 80.

In addition to his career as a concert pianist, Ellsworth Snyder taught at Milton College in Wisconsin until it closed in 1982. His unconventional new music lectures of the late 1960s drew large crowds. He wrote extensively about the Fluxus movement and gave courses in piano pedagogy. In 1971 he took the position of music director at the Frank Lloyd Wright designed First Unitarian Society of Madison, Wisconsin where he created a concert series that embraced both experimental and traditional music.

== As visual artist ==
In 1978 at Cage's prompting Snyder began painting. He developed a distinctive style as an abstractionist that was spare and yet employed the use of expressive gestures. John Cage included Snyder's work in the exhibition Rolywholyover at the Museum of Contemporary Art, Los Angeles, CA. Additionally, Snyder's art work has been exhibited in the Philadelphia Museum of Art, the Walker Art Center in Minneapolis, the Mito Museum in Tokyo, the Menil Collection in Houston, Texas, the Madison Museum of Contemporary Art, and the Elvehjem Museum of Art (now Chazen) in Madison, WI. His work is represented by Rosenthal Fine Art, Jennfer Norbeck Fine Art, in Chicago, Illinois, and Shiloh Gallery.

== Death and archive ==
Snyder died on August 11, 2005, in Madison, Wisconsin, from complications of pulmonary fibrosis. His archive, housed in the special collections of the University of Wisconsin–Madison Memorial Library includes his recordings, writings, interviews, and many examples of his artwork.
