= Milton House (Milton, Wisconsin) =

Historic house in Wisconsin, United States

- U.S. National Register of Historic Places
- U.S. National Historic Landmark
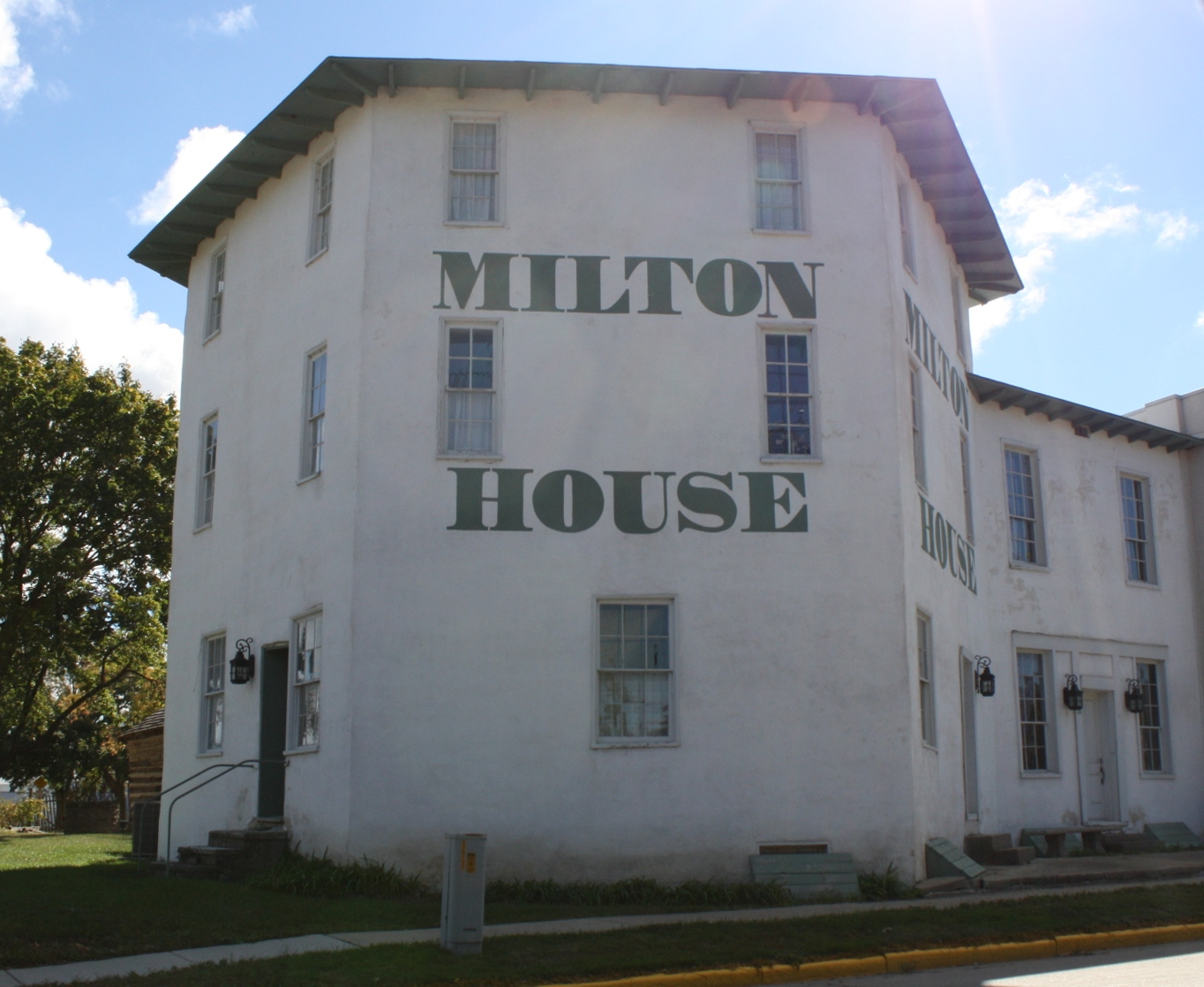
- Milton House

- Location within Wisconsin Location within the United States
- Location: 18 S. Janesville St., Milton, Wisconsin
- Coordinates: 42°46′37″N 88°56′11″W
- Built: 1838
- Architect: Joseph Goodrich
- MPS: Grout Buildings in Milton TR (AD)
- NRHP reference No.: 72000065

Significant dates
- Added to NRHP: February 1, 1972
- Designated NHL: August 5, 1998

Milton House is a historic building located at 18 South Janesville Street in Milton, Wisconsin. It was a stop on the Underground Railroad, a network of people and places that facilitated the movements of enslaved people seeking freedom. The building has been asserted to be the first grout building built in the United States; although that claim is dubious, the house's grout construction apparently was influential. The AIA Journal called it the "Oldest standing concrete structure of any consequence." It is also known for its hexagonal shape.

== Description ==
The Milton House is a grout building consisting of a three-story hexagonal section with a two-story hexagonal wing. The hotel's main rooms are located within the tower, which has a central spiral stairway with rooms on the sides; the common rooms are on the first floor, while the upper floors and the wing contain guest rooms. The house's grout construction inspired Orson Squire Fowler, an advocate of octagonal homes, to recommend the use of grout in such buildings. Behind the house is the Goodrich Cabin, which was built in 1837 and brought to the site in 1839; it was one of two cabins in which Goodrich lived when he first settled in Milton.

== History ==
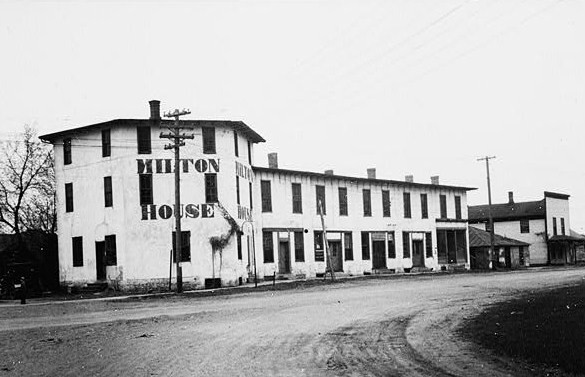
Milton House before roads were paved

Joseph Goodrich, the founder of Milton, settled in Milton in 1839; he built a log cabin, since demolished, and brought the 1837 cabin to the site. Goodrich was a Seventh Day Baptist from the Burned-over district of western New York, and like most people of his faith, he was known for his anti-slavery sentiments. Goodrich built the Milton House in 1845, which became a popular stop for travelers due to its location at the intersection of the military road between Chicago and Madison and the road from Janesville to Fort Atkinson. The house's proximity to these routes and the Rock River allowed it to function as a stop on the Underground Railroad; fugitive slaves in Wisconsin frequently followed the river to the area before taking the road to Racine, where a boat could take them to Canada. A tunnel connects the main building to a nearby cabin; while the circumstances in which the tunnel was constructed are unknown, Joseph's son Ezra claimed the tunnel was used to hide runaway slaves. Goodrich also hosted prominent abolitionist Sojourner Truth at the house when she visited Milton in the 1860s. Goodrich reportedly brought imported cement by wagon and mixed a fluid grout of cement and sand, pouring it into box forms filled with river water.

In 1937 the house was in poor condition, uninhabited, and was threatened with being demolished. The Milton Historical Society acquired and restored the building.

The house and cabin are open to the public via guided tours.

Milton House was declared a National Historic Landmark in 1998. It is the most prominent abolitionist site still standing in Wisconsin.

== See also ==
- List of National Historic Landmarks in Wisconsin
- National Register of Historic Places listings in Rock County, Wisconsin
