= Rush Bullis =

American farmer and politician

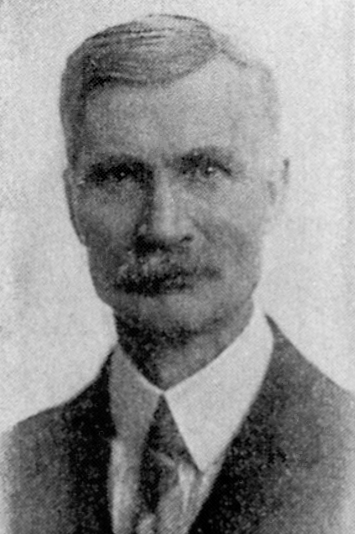

Member of the Wisconsin State Assembly
- In office 1919, 1921

Personal details
- Born: June 10, 1863 Milton Junction, Wisconsin, US
- Died: August 16, 1946 (aged 83) Eau Claire, Wisconsin, US
- Party: Republican
- Spouse: Bertha Burtz (m. 1888)
- Children: 4
- Occupation: Dairy farmer

Rush Bullis (June 10, 1863 – August 16, 1946) was an American farmer and politician.

== Biography ==
Born in Milton Junction, Wisconsin, Bullis was a dairy farmer in the town of Washington, Eau Claire County, Wisconsin. Bullis first came to the Eau Claire area in 1907. He served as chairman of the town of Washington from 1913 to 1918. In 1919 and 1921, Bullis served in the Wisconsin State Assembly and was a Republican. Bullis died in a hospital in Eau Claire, Wisconsin. He was married to Bertha Burtz in 1888, and they had four children.
