= Don S. Wenger =

Donald Samuel Wenger (December 18, 1911 – July 10, 1986) was a major general in the United States Air Force. A physician, he served in a number of leadership roles in the medical operations of the Air Force. His military decorations include the Distinguished Service Medal and the Legion of Merit.

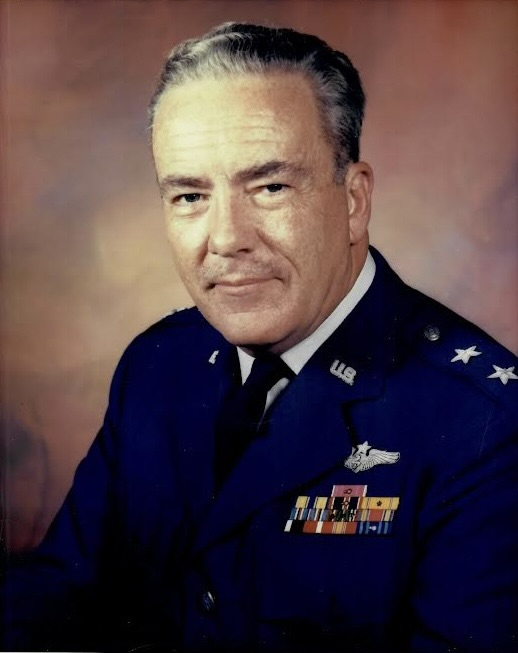
Major General Donald S. Wenger

== Biography ==
Wenger was born in Monroe, Wisconsin, on December 18th, 1911. He married Jane Rost in Ozaukee County, Wisconsin in 1941. He attended Milton College, the University of Wisconsin-Madison, the Marquette University School of Medicine, the St. Mary's University School of Law, and George Washington University. As a civilian he practiced medicine in Milwaukee, Wisconsin. Wenger died on July 10, 1986 at Bethesda Naval Medical Center.

== Career ==
Wenger joined the military in 1942. During World War II he served in Germany. He became a resident in surgery at Oliver General Hospital in Augusta, Georgia in 1947. In 1949 he was assigned to Chanute Air Force Base. From 1953 to 1957 he was assigned to the Office of the Surgeon General of the United States Air Force. In 1957 he was assigned to Lackland Air Force Base as Chairman of the Department of Surgery. Wenger was later reassigned to the Office of the Surgeon General as Chief Professional Consultant. His retirement was effective as of July 1, 1967.

== Service to NASA ==
Apart from his work in the Office of the Surgeon General, Gen. Wagner had duties at NASA from 1959 to 1967. He was present at Cape Canaveral during space flights in case of emergency. In November 1960, he performed a cholecystectomy on Mercury Seven astronaut Gordon Cooper.

As part of his duties, Wenger appeared on To Tell the Truth in an episode airing on October 1, 1962. Two imposters appeared with him, with all three claiming to be General Wenger.
