= David Rubitsky =

United States Army soldier

David Rubitsky (January 29, 1917 – June 28, 2013) was an American veteran of World War II who claimed he was denied the Medal of Honor because he was Jewish. In 1987, the United States Army began a 23-month investigation and concluded that there was "incontestable evidence" that he had not done what he had claimed.

== World War II ==
Rubitsky fought in the New Guinea campaign as a communications sergeant in Company E, Second Battalion, 128th Regiment, 32nd Infantry Division. According to Rubitsky, on December 1–2, 1942 during the Battle of Buna, he singlehandedly defended a bunker with a ".30-cal. machine gun, a .45-cal. pistol, a rifle and grenades." Allegedly, he beat off the Japanese after a 21-hour battle in which he killed 500 to 600 of the enemy, including wounded men he later shot or bayoneted.

Afterward, his company commander, Captain Joseph M. Stehling, surveyed the site and recommended Rubitsky for the Medal of Honor. Stehling's superior, battalion commander Lieutenant Colonel Herbert A. Smith, passed the recommendation along to Colonel John W. Mott, the division's chief of staff who was temporarily in command of three regiments, including Rubitsky's unit. According to Smith, Mott stated, "You mean a Jew for the Congressional Medal of Honor?", then "just laughed and walked away." By the reckoning of the Jewish War Veterans of America, only two were awarded to Jews during World War II. Rubitsky did not receive a lesser award either.

After the war, Rubitsky joined the merchant marine. More than 30 years later, he settled down in Milton, Wisconsin.

== Investigation ==
During a 1986 reunion of the 128th Regiment, Rubitsky's former commanders discovered he had not been awarded the Medal of Honor. The Anti-Defamation League, Stehling (by then a retired brigadier general), Wisconsin Senator Herb Kohl, Governor Tommy Thompson of Wisconsin, Senator Paul Simon of Illinois, and others eventually took up his cause. At the request of Representative Les Aspin, chairman of the House Armed Services Committee, the Army launched an investigation.

Retired Major General Herbert Smith provided a statement of his recollections, supporting Rubitsky. Rubitsky also obtained an old photograph taken from the body of a Japanese officer during the war; the inscription in Japanese on the back purports to have been written by a Colonel Yamamoto, who supposedly planned to commit suicide for his part in an attack in which "600 fine Japanese soldiers died because of a solitary American soldier." While United States Secret Service counterfeiting experts could find no reason to believe it was a fake, military investigators concluded from the "handwriting and choice of words" that the message had not been written by a Japanese. The investigators also found it difficult to believe that a single soldier, with the arms at hand, could have inflicted casualties on such a scale; the largest officially accepted number of soldiers killed by a single American is 75 by Marine Douglas T. Jacobson on Iwo Jima on February 26, 1945.

In December 1989, the Army announced it would not recommend that the award be made because there was "insufficient evidence to substantiate either that the event reported by Mr. Rubitsky occurred or that the Medal of Honor was recommended on his behalf within the stipulated period." Lieutenant Colonel Terence Adkins, head of the military awards branch, reported that American and Japanese records "all agree that the Japanese were in defense and that no major attack took place. Japanese records showed, he said, that fewer than 500 soldiers were effective at the time because their ranks had been depleted by malaria and dysentery." Most of Rubitsky's supporters accepted the decision. However, Joseph Stehling responded by stating, "The Army can say what it wants, but let me say this: The stench of those decaying bodies that day in the jungle stayed with me for years."

The government of Papua New Guinea commissioned an unnamed "noted historian", who concluded that Rubitsky was telling the truth. As a result, he was made an honorary Member of the Order of the British Empire.

== Death ==
Rubitsky died on June 28, 2013, at the age of 96 in East Moline, Illinois.
