= Seventh Day Baptist Mission =

Baptist missionary society

The Seventh Day Baptist Missionary Society is a Baptist missionary society.

It was organized in 1842 by Seventh Day Baptists and is still active. It functions primarily as a missions mobilization organization through partnerships, leadership development, and sustainable projects.

The SDB Missionary Society is separate from an affiliated organization called the Seventh Day Baptist World Federation.

== History ==
A Seventh Day Baptist General Conference was formed in 1802. In its first meeting, the Conference established "that missionaries be sent out, instructed and supported by the General Conference." In 1818 a "Board of Trustees and Directors of Missions" was appointed. In 1821 the Seventh Day Baptist Missionary Magazine began its five-year history. In 1828 a more aggressive and independent society, "the American Seventh Day Baptist Missionary Society," was formed, and the next year the General Board of Missions of Conference turned the responsibilities of missions over to this new society. In 1839 a Hebrew Missionary Society was formed. In 1842 the SDB Missionary Association was started and was merged with the existing society to form the "Seventh Day Baptist Missionary Society."

The home field was primary. But in 1844 interest grew in a foreign mission work. Through the years many fields have been entered. The SDB Missionary Society has done missionary work in China (1847-1950), Palestine (1854-1860), England (1896-1900), Malawi (1898-1914), (1953-1990), Ghana (1901), Guyana (1913-1930), (1961-1974), Jamaica (1923-1978), Philippines (1979-1985), Finland (1987-1990), Mexico (1998-2008).

Today, the SDB Missionary Society primarily functions as a missions mobilization organization (rather than a sending agency), working with partners in more than 40 countries.

== See also ==
- Protestant missionary societies in China during the 19th Century
- Timeline of Chinese history
- 19th-century Protestant missions in China
- List of Protestant missionaries in China
- Christianity in China
- Huizhong Church, Shanghai, built by the Seventh Day Baptist Mission
