= Milton College =

Private college in Milton, Wisconsin (1844–1982)

Coordinates: 42°46′28″N 88°56′33″W

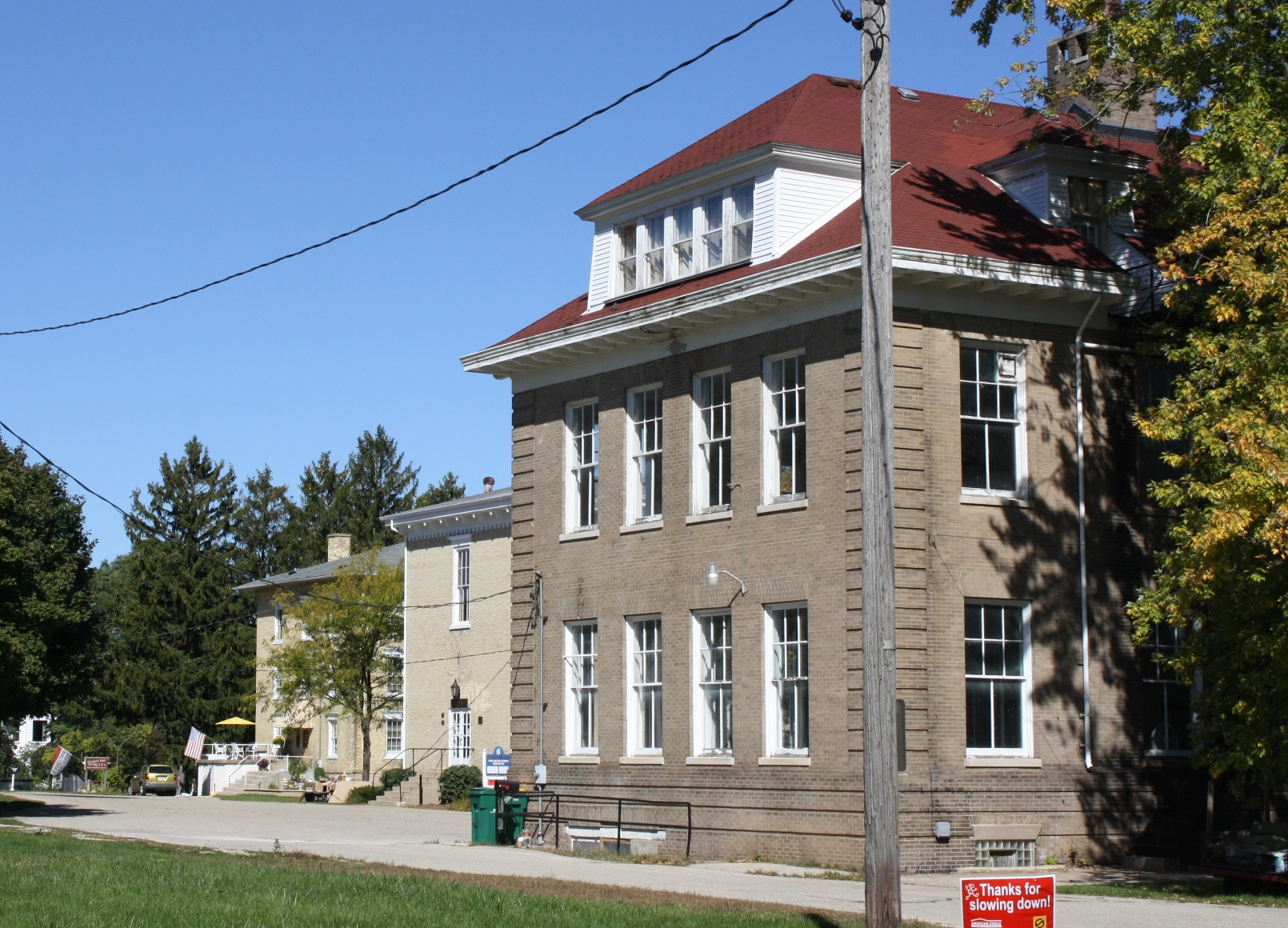
- Former name: Milton Academy
- Type: Private
- Active: 1844–1982
- Location: Milton, Wisconsin, United States
- Colors: Blue and Brown before 1964; Blue and Gold after 1964
- Nickname: Wildcats
- Sporting affiliations: National Association of Intercollegiate Athletics

Milton College was a private college located in Milton, Wisconsin, United States. Founded in 1844 as the Milton Academy, it closed in 1982. Its campus is now part of the Milton Historic District.

== History ==
The college was founded as the Milton Academy (high school) by a group of early Milton settlers, including Milton House owner Joseph Goodrich. It eventually grew to encompass sixteen buildings spread over 24 acres (97,000 m^{2}). Its music department was renowned, and a high percentage of foreign students for the era kept the student body diverse. Although initially many of the students came from Milton, in later years alumni of the college would stay in Milton or return.

=== Closing ===
On May 15, 1982, Milton College abruptly closed its doors. At the time, it was Wisconsin's oldest continually operating college. The college's board of trustees had voted 18–2 to close the campus following a notification from the North Central Association of Colleges and Schools that the college's accreditation would be dropped in the fall term; it had previously been on probationary status. The decision from North Central stemmed from the college's continually shaky financial situation, which culminated in a $4 million debt. Without accreditation, the college would not have seen any federal loans or grants, adding to an already difficult situation of decreasing student enrollment. Furthermore, it would have no longer been able to compete with schools in the Wisconsin State University System.

Some 135 students had been planning to come back to campus when the school closed, many with only a few credits left until completion of their studies. Officials negotiated with other campuses to accept Milton students.

Milton College transcripts are stored at the University of Wisconsin-Whitewater, located 13 miles from Milton.

== Campus life ==
=== Athletics ===
The college was a member of the NAIA and participated in the sports of baseball, basketball, and football. The Milwaukee Bucks chose Milton College's gymnasium as its pre-season training camp in 1968-69. Among the players was Lew Alcindor, who changed his name to Kareem Abdul-Jabbar in 1971.

==== Milton Wildcats football ====
Milton fielded its first football team in 1899 and its last in 1981. No teams were fielded from 1904 to 1915 and from 1943 to 1945. During this time the college produced seven All-Americans and nine conference titles, in 1935, 1956, 1961, 1964, 1974, 1976, 1978, 1980, and 1981. The Wildcats played in 419 games during this time with a record of 194–207–18. The school was a member of the Illini-Badger Football Conference from 1976 to 1982.

=== Greek life ===
There were a number of fraternities and sororities until 1977, when none were left due to falling attendance.

=== Media ===
- The Wildcat – student newspaper
- The Blue and Gold – student newspaper
- Experimental Spectrum – student newspaper
- Milton College Review – student newspaper
- Fides – college yearbook
- WVMC-AM – college radio station
- WMDF-FM – college radio station

== Campus adaptive reuse ==
When the school closed, the buildings were turned over to the banks that kept it alive over the years. Most of the buildings have been converted to commercial or residential use.

- Main Hall is maintained by the Main Hall Preservation Society and serves as a memorial to the college. Portraits in the building commemorate faculty and alumni over the years.
- The library is now the Shaw Community Center, owned by the City of Milton. It houses both city hall and the Milton Public Library.
- Some dorms have been converted into apartment buildings.
- The gymnasium is the home of a local church called The Chapel.

== Notable alumni ==
Name	Year	Notability	References
Stephen Bolles		United States House of Representatives from Wisconsin	
Hellen M. Brooks		educator and representative to Wisconsin State Assembly	
Ward Christensen		computer pioneer and inventor of XMODEM and co-inventor of CBBS, the first computer bulletin board system (BBS).	
Kathleen Clement		Renowned painter	
Kerry G. Denson		U.S. National Guard General	
Joseph Dutton		U.S. Commissioner to the U.S. Court in Memphis, Tennessee; Catholic Lay Missionary to the leper colony in Molokai	
Lucy Mabel Hall-Brown		Physician and writer	
Adoniram J. Holmes		United States House of Representatives from Iowa	
Dave Kraayeveld		former professional football player with the National Football League	
Dave Krieg		former professional football player with the National Football League	
Gilbert L. Laws		United States House of Representatives from Nebraska	
Canute R. Matson		Sheriff of Cook County, Illinois at the time of the 1886 Haymarket Square Riot	
Kerwin Mathews		actor	
Christopher J. Rollis		newspaper editor and representative to Wisconsin State Assembly	
Charles P. Smith		State Treasurer of Wisconsin	
Francis Marion Smith		business magnate known as "The Borax King"	
Don S. Wenge		U.S. Air Force Major General	
Albert Whitford		astronomer and director of the Lick Observatory	

== Notable faculty ==
Name	Notability	References
William Clarke Whitford	educator, legislator, and pastor of the Seventh Day Baptist Church from Wisconsin	
Lorenzo D. Harvey	Superintendent of Public Instruction of Wisconsin	
Edward Searing	Superintendent of Public Instruction of Wisconsin	
Ellsworth Snyder	Abstract painter, professional pianist, conductor, and scholar	
