= Kerry G. Denson =

United States Army general

Kerry G. Denson is a retired brigadier general in the National Guard of the United States and former Deputy Adjutant General of the Army in Wisconsin.

== Education ==
- B.A. - Milton College
- Graduate - Air War College

== Career ==
Denson originally joined the United States Army in 1969 and served two tours in the Vietnam War and was a flight instructor at Hunter Army Airfield. He would transfer to the Wisconsin Army National Guard in 1971. Denson was promoted to Brigadier General on October 6, 2000.

Awards he has received include the Silver Star, the Distinguished Flying Cross, the Bronze Star Medal, the Purple Heart, the Meritorious Service Medal, the Air Medal with award numeral 35, the Army Commendation Medal, the Air Force Commendation Medal, the Army Achievement Medal, the Good Conduct Medal, the Army Reserve Components Achievement Medal with silver oak leaf cluster, the National Defense Service Medal with service star, the Vietnam Service Medal, the Humanitarian Service Medal, the Armed Forces Reserve Medal with silver hourglass device, the Army Service Ribbon, the Army Reserve Components Overseas Training Ribbon, the Vietnam Campaign Medal, and the Vietnam Gallantry Cross.
