= Milton, Wisconsin =

- City
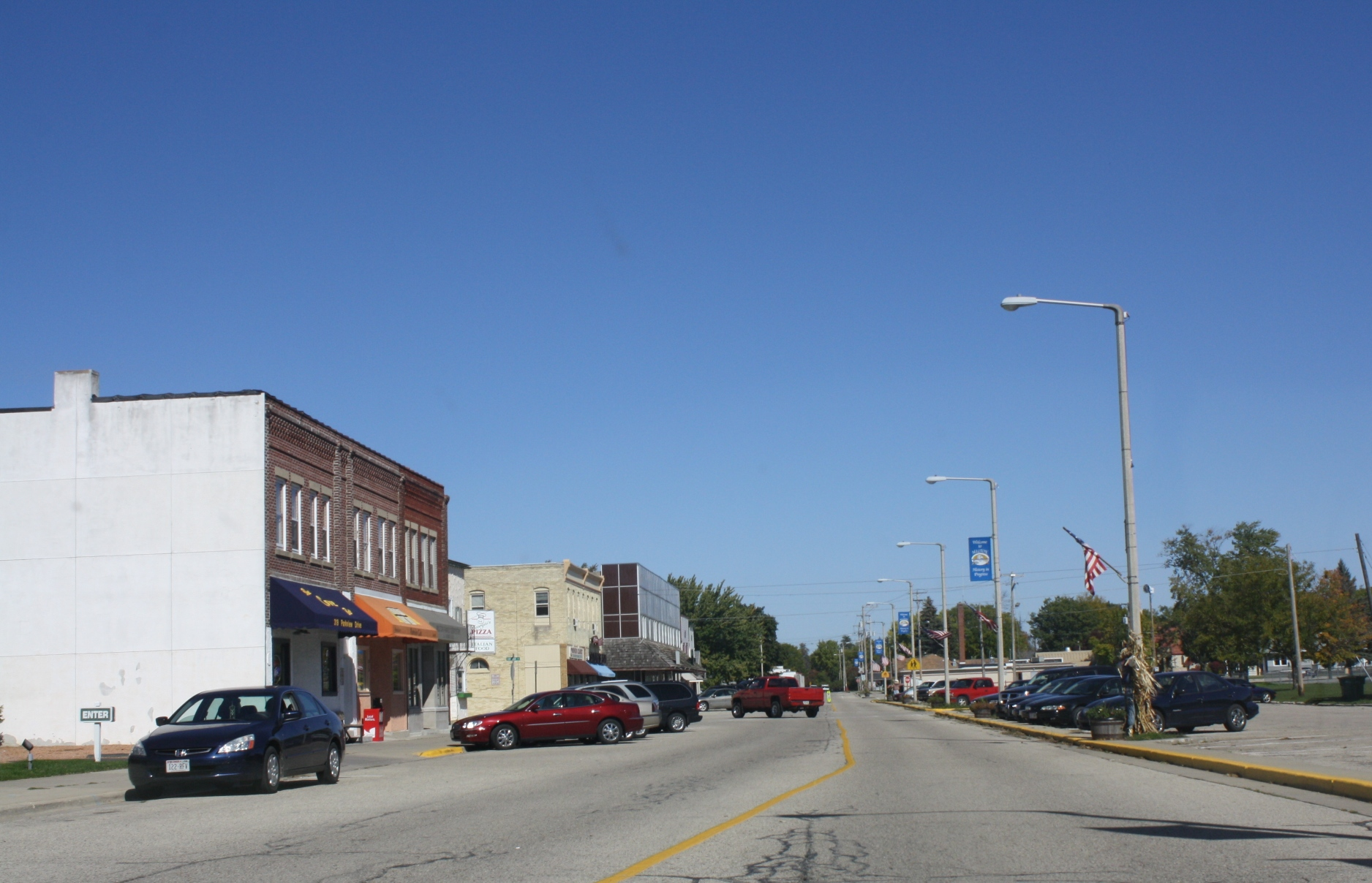
- Looking north in downtown Milton
- Nickname: History in Progress
- Location of Milton in Rock County, Wisconsin

- Location within Wisconsin Location within the United States
- Coordinates: 42°46′40″N 88°57′18″W
- Country: United States
- State: Wisconsin
- County: Rock County

Government
  - Mayor: Anissa Welch (D)

Area
  - Total: 4.28 sq mi (11.08 km^{2})
  - Land: 4.26 sq mi (11.03 km^{2})
  - Water: 0.015 sq mi (0.04 km^{2})
- Elevation: 889 ft (271 m)

Population (2020)
  - Total: 5,716
  - Density: 1,341.8/sq mi (518.1/km^{2})
- Time zone: UTC-6 (Central (CST))
  - Summer (DST): UTC-5 (CDT)
- ZIP Code: 53563
- Area code: 608
- FIPS code: 55-52200
- GNIS feature ID: 1569532
- Website: www.milton-wi.gov

Milton is a city in Rock County, Wisconsin, United States. The population was 5,716 at the 2020 census.

== History ==
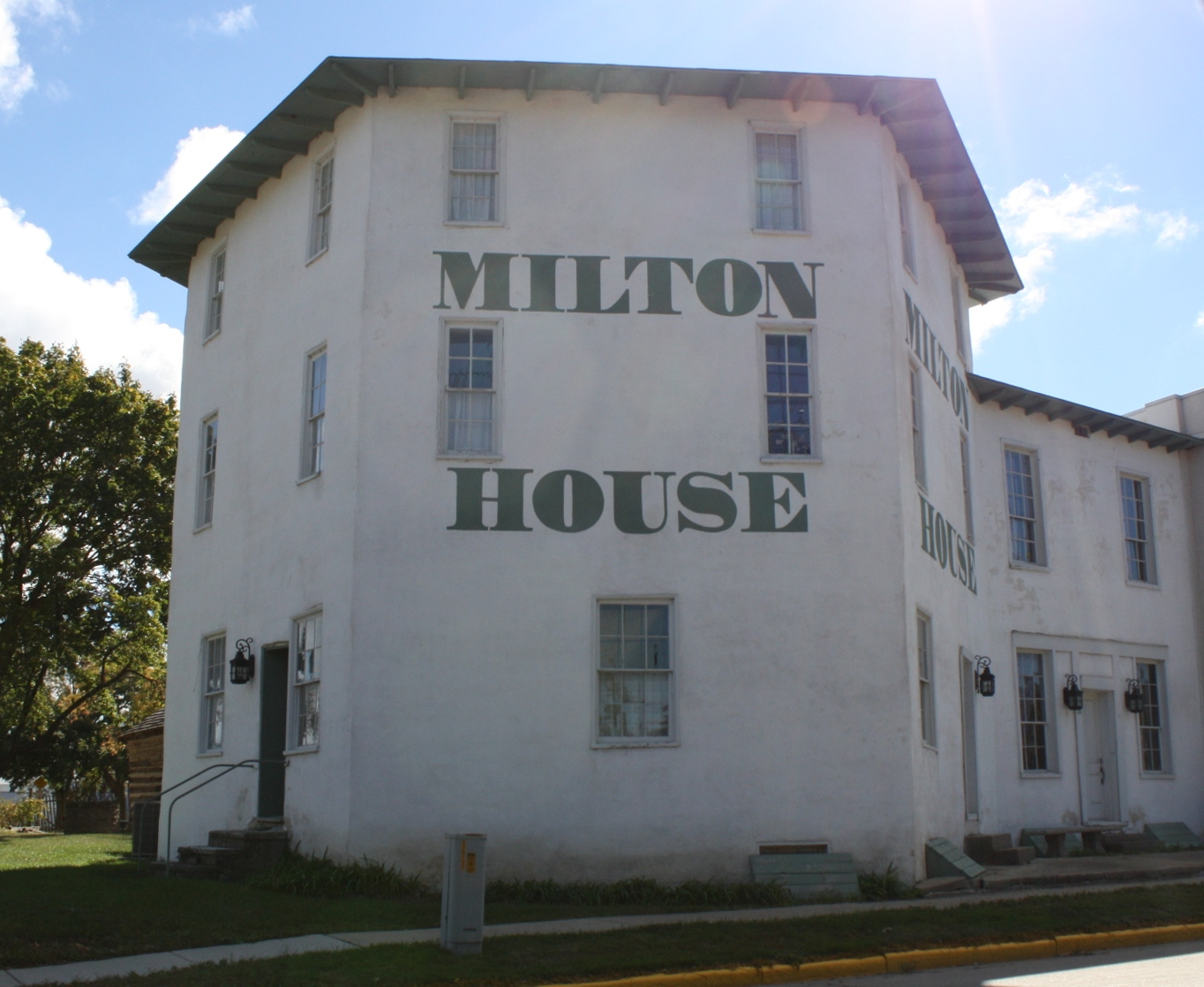
Milton House

The city was formed as a result of the 1967 merger of the villages of Milton and Milton Junction. In November of that year, ballots were cast by 1,093 voters from both villages (Milton: 515 to 47 in favor of the merge; Milton Junction: 322 to 201 in favor of the merge), and the referendum to merge the two was approved by 77%.

Originally named Prairie du Lac, Milton was settled in 1838 by Joseph Goodrich, who came from Alfred, New York with his family to the locality for religious and educational reasons. As soon as he moved he organized a Seventh Day Baptist Church in November 1840, and in 1844 a school that would later become a college. He also built an inn, a Milton House, without crossing two trade routes.

The Milton House is today one of the oldest poured grout structures in the United States. A noted abolitionist, Goodrich is known to have helped fugitive slaves escape to freedom via the Underground Railroad.

It is believed that Milton is named after poet John Milton, author of "Paradise Lost," after a settler remarked that the town was his "Paradise Regained" after leaving his previous home, which he thought of as a paradise lost.

== Geography ==
According to the United States Census Bureau, the city has a total area of 3.54 square miles (9.17 km^{2}), of which 3.53 square miles (9.14 km^{2}) is land and 0.01 square miles (0.03 km^{2}) is water.

== Demographics ==
Historical population
| Census | Pop. | Note | %± |
|---|---|---|---|
| 1880 | 508 | | — |
| 1890 | 685 | | 34.8% |
| 1910 | 833 | | — |
| 1920 | 834 | | 0.1% |
| 1930 | 1,128 | | 35.3% |
| 1940 | 1,266 | | 12.2% |
| 1950 | 1,549 | | 22.4% |
| 1960 | 1,671 | | 7.9% |
| 1970 | 3,699 | | 121.4% |
| 1980 | 4,092 | | 10.6% |
| 1990 | 4,434 | | 8.4% |
| 2000 | 5,132 | | 15.7% |
| 2010 | 5,546 | | 8.1% |
| 2020 | 5,716 | | 3.1% |
U.S. Decennial Census; 2010–2020

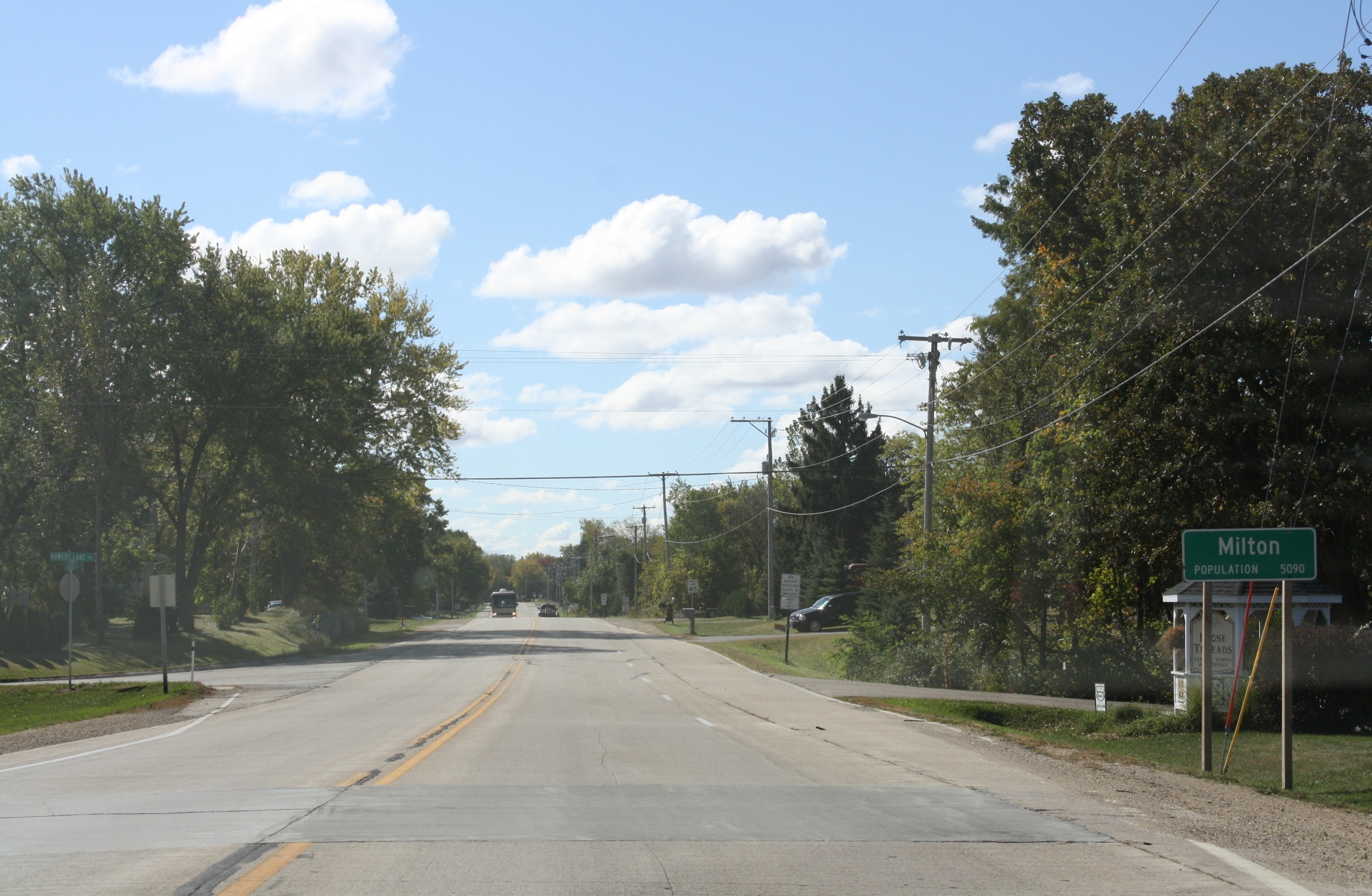
Sign on WIS 26

=== 2010 census ===
As of the census of 2010, there were 5,546 people, 2,231 households, and 1,499 families residing in the city. The population density was 1,571.1 inhabitants per square mile (606.6/km^{2}). There were 2,382 housing units at an average density of 674.8 per square mile (260.5/km^{2}). The racial makeup of the city was 96.0% White, 0.5% African American, 0.2% Native American, 1.0% Asian, 1.1% from other races, and 1.1% from two or more races. Hispanic or Latino people of any race were 2.4% of the population.

There were 2,231 households, of which 35.8% had children under the age of 18 living with them, 49.4% were married couples living together, 11.9% had a female householder with no husband present, 5.9% had a male householder with no wife present, and 32.8% were non-families. 26.8% of all households were made up of individuals, and 11% had someone living alone who was 65 years of age or older. The average household size was 2.48 and the average family size was 2.98.

The median age in the city was 35.8 years. 26.3% of residents were under the age of 18; 7.8% were between the ages of 18 and 24; 28.3% were from 25 to 44; 25.1% were from 45 to 64, and 12.5% were 65 years of age or older. The gender makeup of the city was 49.1% male and 50.9% female.

=== 2000 census ===
As of the census of 2000, there were 5,132 people, 2,034 households, and 1,383 families residing in the city. The population density was 1,587.8 people per square mile (613.5/km^{2}). There were 2,129 housing units at an average density of 658.7 per square mile (254.5/km^{2}). The racial makeup of the city was 98.07% White, 0.18% Black or African American, 0.14% Native American, 0.31% Asian, 0.49% from other races, and 0.82% from two or more races. 0.92% of the population were Hispanic or Latino of any race.

There were 2,034 households, out of which 36.6% had children under the age of 18 living with them, 52.9% were married couples living together, 11.2% had a female householder with no husband present, and 32.0% were non-families. 26.5% of all households were made up of individuals, and 10.8% had someone living alone who was 65 years of age or older. The average household size was 2.51 and the average family size was 3.04.

In the city, the population was spread out, with 27.6% under the age of 18, 8.6% from 18 to 24, 31.7% from 25 to 44, 20.3% from 45 to 64, and 11.9% who were 65 years of age or older. The median age was 34 years. For every 100 females, there were 96.2 males. For every 100 females age 18 and over, there were 90.6 males.

The median income for a household in the city was $43,201, and the median income for a family was $52,384. Males had a median income of $39,392 versus $22,866 for females. The per capita income for the city was $22,058. About 3.3% of families and 6.7% of the population were below the poverty line, including 7.1% of those under age 18 and 13.4% of those aged 65 or over.

=== Religion ===
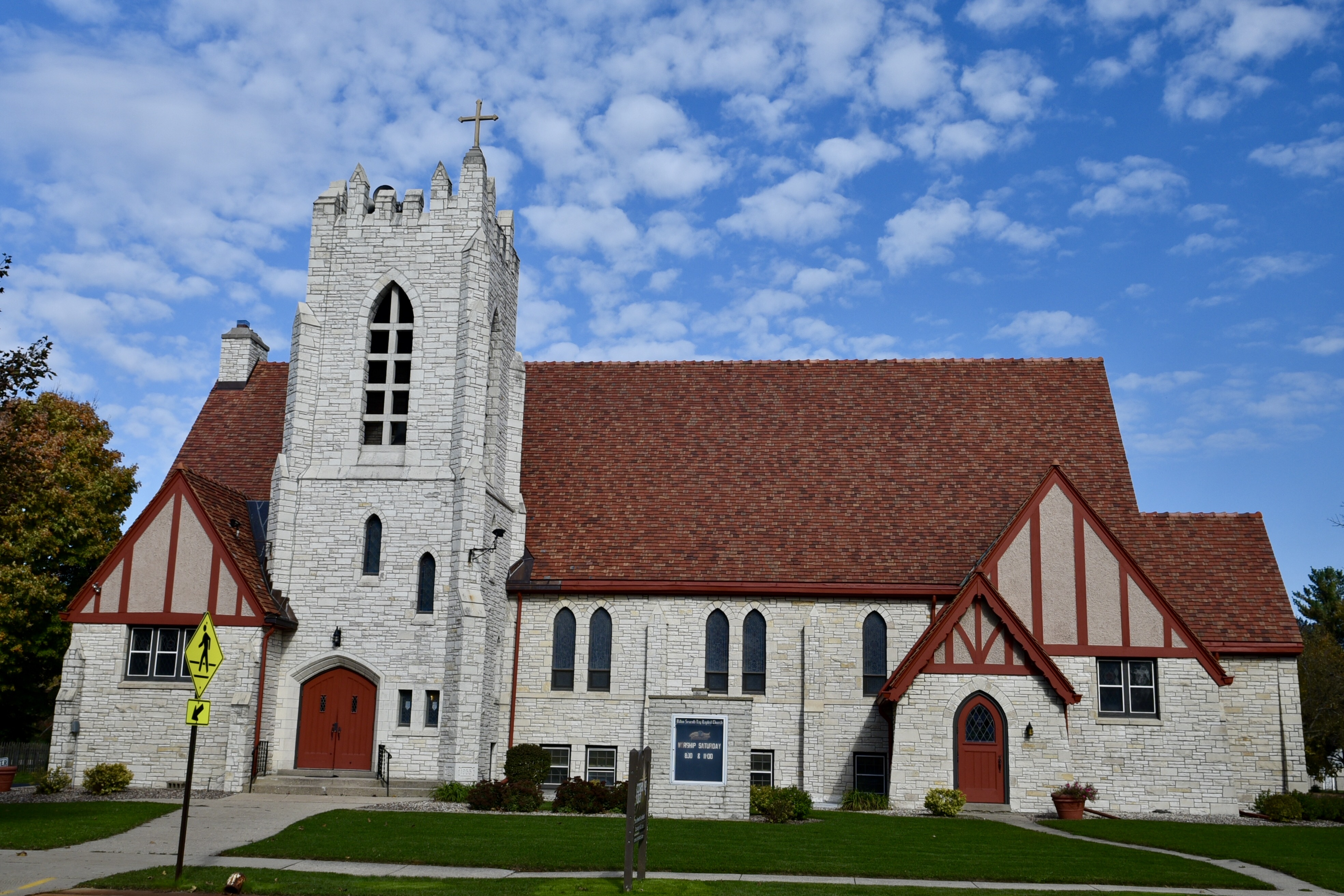
Milton Seventh Day Baptist Church

The Seventh Day Baptist Church in Milton, built in 1934, was added to the National Register of Historic Places in August 2016.

== Government ==
Milton has a mayor-council form of government. The mayor is the chief executive, elected for a term of two years. The current mayor is Anissa Welch, first elected in April 2015 and now serving her fourth term.

Former mayors include Brett J. Frazier, who created a short lived “Mayor and Council member for a day” essay contest, which was won by Elanor “Ellie” Parker in 2014.

=== Legislative representation ===
Following the 2022 redistricting, the city of Milton falls within Wisconsin's 33rd Assembly district and the 11th State Senate district.

Under the previous district plan, Milton was part of the 43rd Assembly district and 15th State Senate district. Under both the 2011 and 2022 congressional district plans, Milton was part of the 1st congressional district.

== Economy ==
Milton is the site of a $70 million ethanol plant built by United Cooperative. A Cargill animal nutrition plant is located in Milton, with a 170-foot (52 m) grain elevator.

== Education ==
Milton Schools include Milton High School, Milton Middle School, Northside Intermediate School, Milton East Elementary, Milton West Elementary, Consolidated Elementary, Harmony School, and Blackhawk Tech which was MECAS (Milton Edgerton Clinton Alternative School).

The former Milton College started operating in 1844, being incorporated into the Wisconsin legislature in 1848 as Academy DuLac, offering high school courses concurrently with higher education. The academy progressed to the point of becoming a college in 1867. The college had clear connections with the US's Seventh Day Baptist church, which offered them operational support. Milton native Albert Whitford, a graduate of the college, became a leading astronomer. Another alumnus, Dave Krieg, was an All-Pro quarterback with the Seattle Seahawks.

The city is increasingly tied to Janesville, its larger neighbor to the south, and parts of Janesville are now within the Milton School District as that city expands to the north and east. Students who go to Milton may live in several other districts surrounding Milton, such as Janesville and Harmony district.

== Notable people ==
- James C. Bartholf, Wisconsin editor and politician
- Rush Bullis, Wisconsin legislator and farmer, born in Milton Junction
- Solomon C. Carr, Wisconsin farmer and politician, lived in Milton Junction
- Willis Cole, professional baseball player
- Leo Crowley, head of the Foreign Economic Administration
- Ludwig Kumlien, ornithologist
- John T. Manske, Wisconsin State Representative
- Mark Neumann, U.S. Representative
- Alexander Paul, Wisconsin legislator and politician, born in Milton Junction
- Merritt Clarke Ring, lawyer and politician
- David Rubitsky, World War II veteran
- Mike Saunders, professional football player
- Bill Shadel, CBS radio and TV news anchor
- Don Vruwink, Wisconsin educator and politician
- Albert Whitford, astronomer, for whom the asteroid 2301 Whitford is named
- William Clarke Whitford, educator
