= Seventh Day Baptists =

Branch of Christianity

Seventh Day Baptist Church
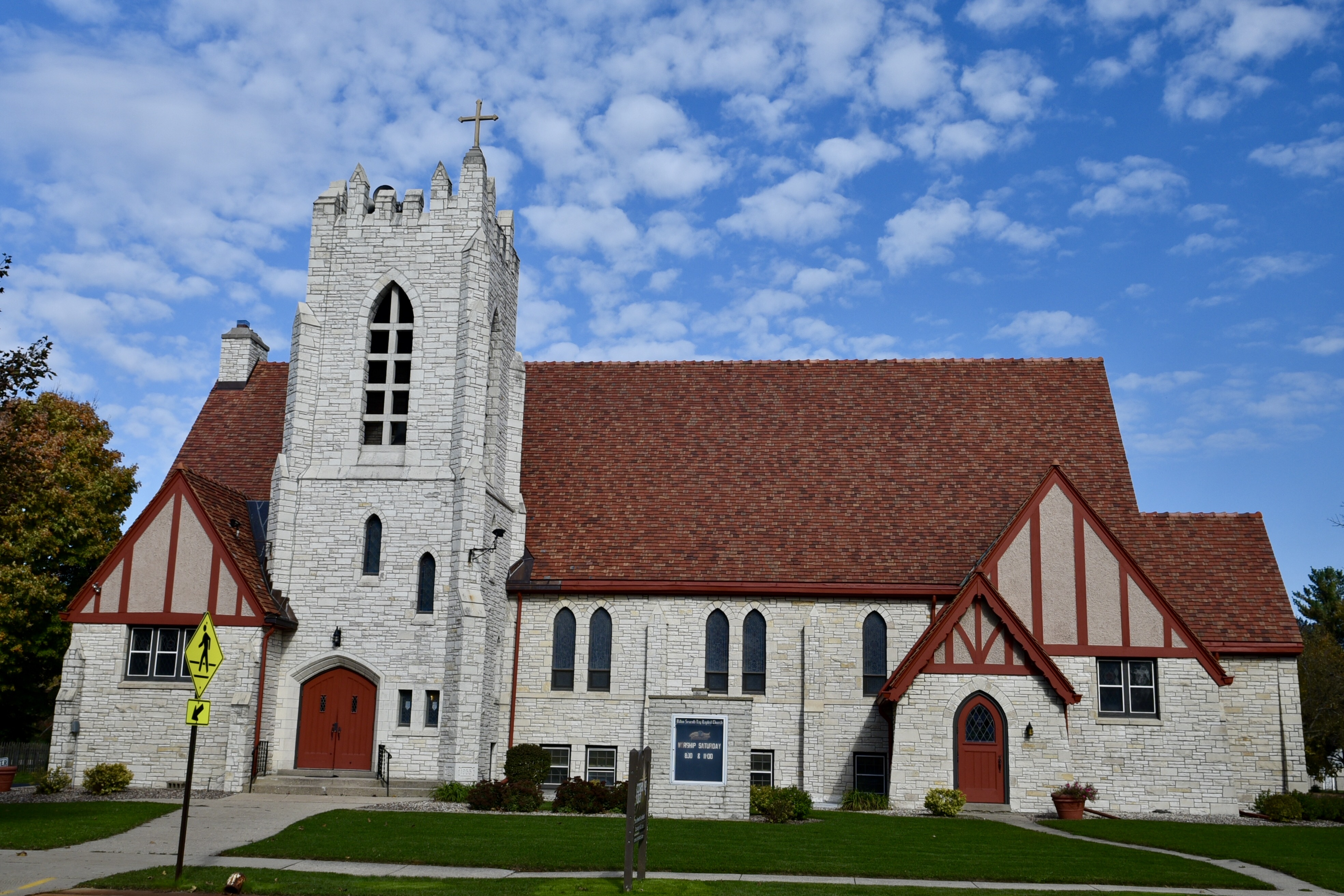
- Seventh Day Baptist Church in Milton, Wisconsin
- Abbreviation: SDB
- Orientation: Baptist
- Scripture: Bible
- Theology: Sabbatarian
- Associations: Seventh Day Baptist World Federation
- Region: At least in 20 countries and on all continents
- Founder: James Ockford, Peter Chamberlen, William Saller, among others
- Origin: 1650; England
- Congregations: Just over 520 churches
- Members: 45,000 approximately
- Official website: https://www.seventhdaybaptist.org/

Seventh Day Baptists are Baptists who observe the Sabbath on the seventh day of the week, Saturday, as a holy day to God. They adopt a theology common to Baptists, profess the Bible as the only infallible rule of faith and practice, perform the baptism of believers by immersion, and believe in the autonomy of the local church. They profess a statement of faith instituted on fundamental precepts of belief. Seventh Day Baptists rest on Saturday as a sign of obedience in a covenant relationship with God and not as a condition of salvation.

Most Christians and churches in history made Sunday their principal day of rest instead of Saturday, but a minority practise seventh-day Sabbatarianism. There are reports of Sabbath-keeping in different parts of the world. In England, the first Baptists to keep the seventh day only appear in the middle of the 17th century, and it was not the mainstream belief.

Seventh Day Baptists consist of churches all over the world, with over 520 churches and at least 45,000 members. Many have constant interaction among themselves through conferences in each country and through the Seventh Day Baptist World Federation. Other groups are independent. In general, federations maintain good relations with other Baptist churches and Protestant denominations as well as establishing links with other Christian institutions and unions worldwide.

== History ==
English Baptists date back to the early 17th century Puritan Nonconformism, in which many did not "conform" to the governance and usages of the Church of England and formed other churches. Among these congregations were the Gainsborough church whose leaders were John Smyth and Thomas Helwys. In 1608, they left England in exile and went to the Netherlands. Soon, the congregation concluded that infants should not be baptized because of the lack of biblical and apostolical support. The exiled English church in Amsterdam became what is considered the first Baptist church. Two years later, Helwys expelled Smyth and returned with some of the supporters to England, reestablishing the church in London. From there, Baptist practices and teachings spread throughout the country. However, they observed their weekly Sabbath on Sunday, the first day of the week.

=== Mill Yard Seventh Day Baptist Church ===
The beginning of the observance of the Sabbath on the seventh day of the week in England caused the occurrence of well-known debates on the subject to arise. These started in London, where one of the "Seventh-Day Men", a tailor and self-taught Bible student called Hamlet Jackson, converted a Minister couple, John and Dorothy Traske, to the observance of the seventh day (Saturday). In 1614, John Traske ordained Hamlet and three other Seventh-Day Men to proclaim their discoveries and anoint the sick. In 1616 John and Dorothy were arrested but Hamlet's Ministry was able to establish the Mill Yard Seventh Day Baptist Church in London in 1617.

John Traske was accused of writing two scandalous letters to the king and sentenced by the authorities to prison on 19 June 1618, for "…aspiring to be the leader of a Jewish faction". After a year in prison, John Traske recanted, was released and tried to divert his followers from this and other doctrines he preached. However, Dorothy Traske did not deny her convictions and remained in prison for 25 years. After these, other groups also kept and declared Sabbath observance, which led to retaliation by the political and ecclesiastical authorities of the time such as when Theophilus Brabourne was imprisoned for 18 months and threatened with the loss of his ears for publishing his "Discourse on the Sabbath" in 1628.

When Christmas, Easter and Pentecost were banned in 1643/4 leading to a number of riots, a variety of "Independent" churches sprang up supporting the Seventh Day Baptists' right to dissent. Then in 1645 Henry Jessey converted into a Seventh Day Baptist arguing in 1647 that the seventh-day was "[Christ's] Sabbath which he blessed and sanctified". Subsequently the new Independent churches began to be tolerated and enjoyed relative religious and political freedom from 1649 under the republican rule of the Commonwealth of England. With this newfound freedom, England's first Seventh Day Baptist Church became secure. In 1650, Brabourne's pupil, James Ockford, published in London the book The Doctrine of the Fourth Commandment, Deformed by Popery, Reformed & Restored to its Primitive Purity, which was the first writing of a Baptist defending Seventh-day Sabbath observance, when the overwhelming majority of Baptists in England observed the Sabbath on Sunday. The book generated such a nuisance that the mayor of Salisbury, the city where Ockford lived, asked the president of Parliament for guidance on how to handle the work; a parliamentary committee determined that all copies should be burned without giving the opportunity for James Ockford to defend them. Only one copy has escaped, kept today in a library in Oxford.

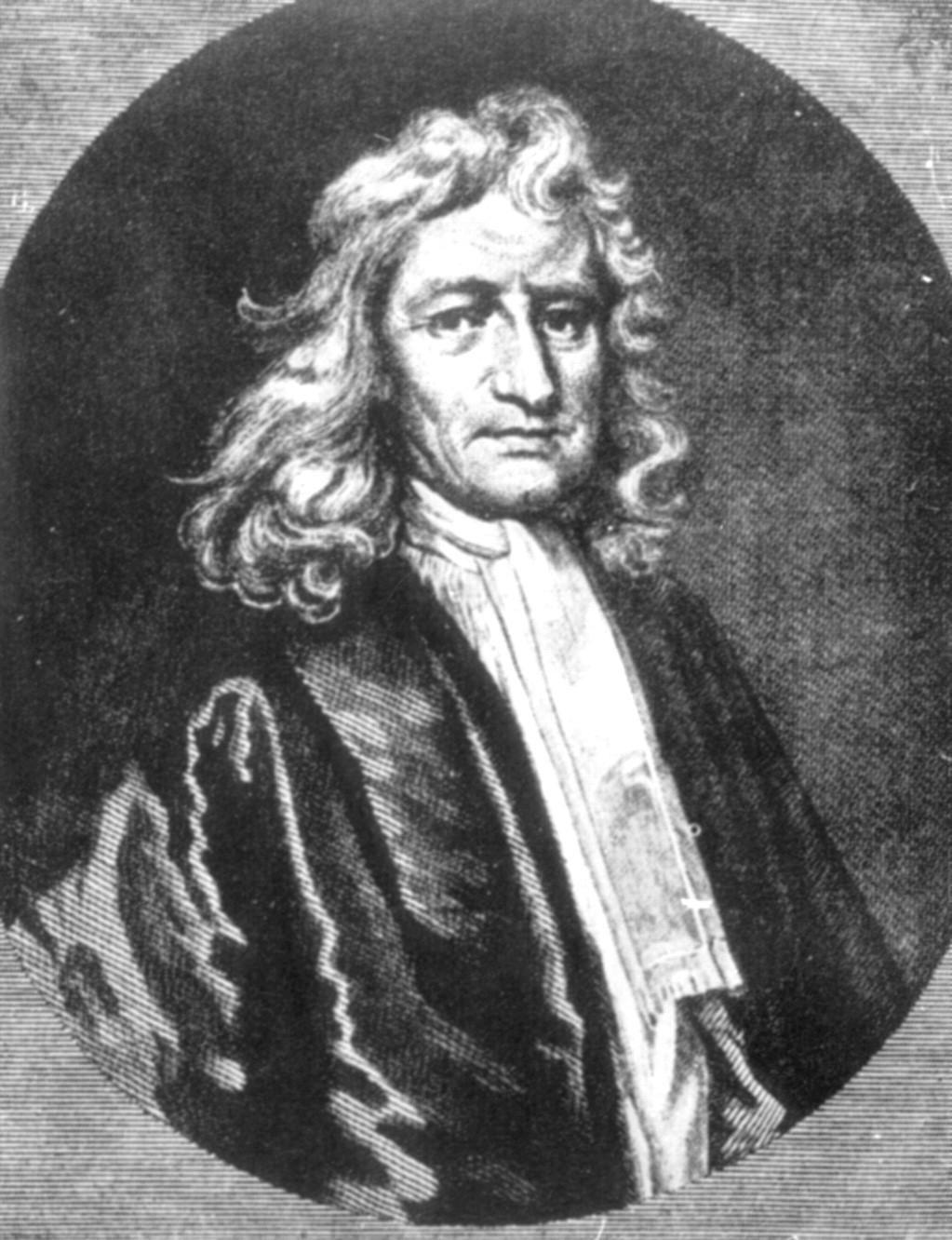
Dr. Peter Chamberlen in 1658

The first official Seventh Day Baptist service in London took place at the Mill Yard Church in 1651, led by Peter Chamberlen, M.D., "the Third". The first records of church activities were destroyed in a fire; the second record book is in possession of the Seventh Day Baptist Historical Library and Archives and begins in 1673. The first pastor to be officially considered responsible for the congregation was William Saller, who among other activities, wrote eleven books and a booklet, in addition to an appeal to magistrates reporting concern over laws imposing rest on Sunday. The local church continues its activities to this day under the name of Mill Yard Seventh Day Baptist Church.

There were matters among the Seventh Day Baptists that were discussed in addition to the uniform agreement of the Sabbath, among them the general propitiation. Most Baptists were "General Baptists" and believed in a general propitiation. Certainly in 1710 when it attracted John Maulden (d. 1714) the Millyard Church was a Seventh-day Arminian Baptist Church. However, some Seventh Day Baptists were influenced by Calvinist doctrine and believed in predestination, in which salvation is limited to the elect, the rest being predestined to condemnation, which is why they were called "private Baptists". This difference does not appear to have prevented fellowship among Seventh Day Baptists in the beginning. However, it generated greater discomfort from the 17th century onwards. Today, Seventh Day Baptist churches still continue to leave this issue open, with no direct mention in their declaration of faith or other official church document.

=== Under the Restoration ===
In 1660 with the end of the republican government and the restoration of the monarchy in England, relative religious freedom was again restricted mainly to English Dissidents, forcing Seventh Day Baptists to increasingly unite in specific locations. Edward Stennett wrote in 1668 for Seventh Day Baptists in Newport in the American Colony of Rhode Island that there were in England approximately nine or ten churches that observed the Sabbath on Saturday.

The minister and master at Oxford, Francis Bampfield, and his brother Thomas Bampfield, were also prominent Seventh Day Baptists. Francis founded the Pinner's Hall Seventh Day Baptist Church in London in 1676. He was one of the first to propose an association that encompassed England's seventh day Baptist churches and their colonies in North America, technical best biblical instruction for children and ministers, as well as strategies for method conversion.

Seventh Day Baptist individuals and groups continue to appear in Britain; however, they did not achieve much growth compared to North America. Between the mid-17th century and 1910, Don A. Sanford lists between five and sixteen congregations that existed in the United Kingdom: three in London, one in Colchester and Braintree and others that existed from Norfolk to Dorsetshire and Gloucestershire. The UK currently has very few Seventh Day Baptist churches, their survival is largely the result of missionary work of the Jamaica Seventh Day Baptist Conference.

=== United States ===
The first immigration to the British colonies in North America occurred for political, religious, economic and social reasons. The organization of the American colonies conferred more religious freedom than in the territory of the British Isles, which provided the development and solidification of different Protestant groups and churches. The first to be recognized as a Seventh Day Baptist in the Americas was Stephen Mumford and his wife Anne, who were from the Baptist Church of Tewkesbury and personally observed the Sabbath on Saturday. The Mumfords emigrated to the American colonies in 1664, but little is known about their lives in England.

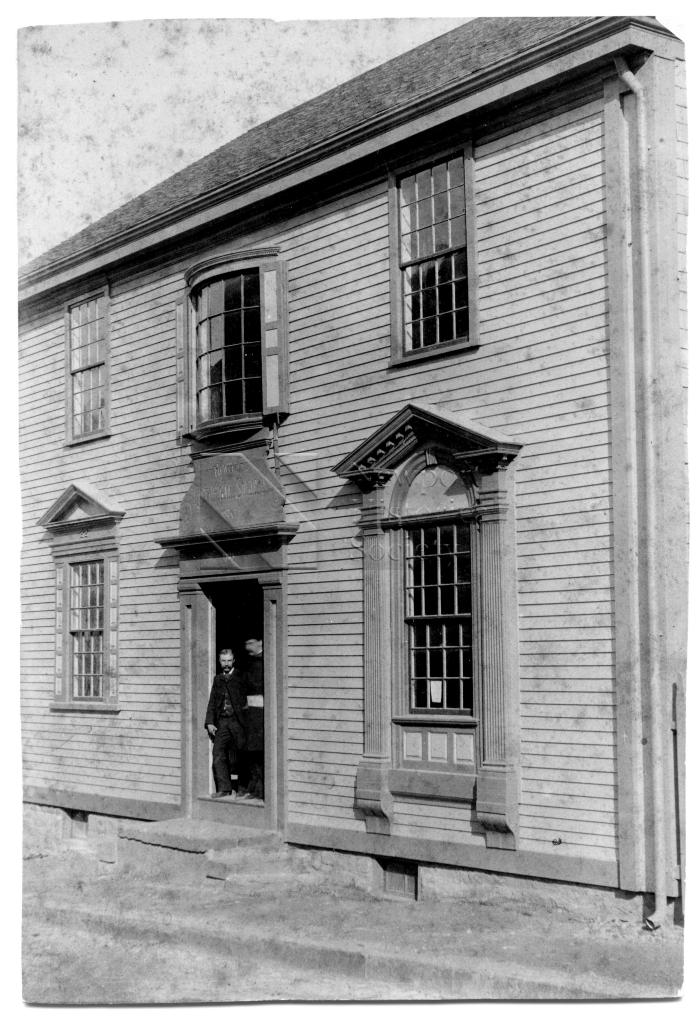
Newport's Old Seventh Day Baptist Church on 1730 Barney Street

After some adamant opposition by some Baptists to the Sabbath rest on Sunday of the First Baptist Church of the Colony of Rhode Island (located in Newport), about five to fifty Baptists who kept the Seventh-day Sabbath left the church, united with the Mumford couple and founded on 3 January 1672, Newport, Rhode Island Seventh Day Baptist Church, which was the first Seventh Day Baptist church in the Americas. The services took place in a building in Green End (address) but it grew small with the growth of the church, land was then purchased on Barney Street and the new temple built in 1730. With this, Newport became a center in which they expanded to other American colonies. A few years later two other important churches were established in the early 18th century, in Philadelphia, Pennsylvania, and Piscataway, New Jersey. By 1776, there were a few hundred members and twelve churches established in the Americas, including two governors of the Colony of Rhode Island: Richard Ward and Samuel Ward. Over time, the Seventh Day Baptists expanded, following the development of the colonies.

The course of expanding the Seventh Day Baptist churches and increasing the territorial distance between them culminated in the organization of a General Conference. At the end of the 18th century and the beginning of the following century, annual meetings and assemblies were taking place between some churches to share unity and the Lord's Supper. On 11 September 1801, at an annual meeting of some churches in Hopkinton, Rhode Island, Henry Clarke of Brookfield, New York, proposed "the union in an institution with the purpose of propagating our religion in different parts of the United States, sending missionaries from various churches, at their own expense". In September 1802, the majority of the eight Seventh Day Baptist churches voted in favor of the proposal, with the result that the General Conference was founded. The service conference for carrying out missionary work, promoting unity and a great growth in the number of members and locations. It continues its activities until today, obtained the union with the Seventh Day Baptist churches of Canada, passing the nomination to the Seventh Day Baptist General Conference of the USA and Canada. Undertook most of the mission fields of the Seventh Day Baptists and through these they were instituting and spreading the churches and conferences in several other countries of the world. Currently, the conference is member of the Baptist World Alliance.

The church was committed to education, but they encountered many difficulties. As the church grew, they managed to found some educational institutions. Alfred University started as a college in 1836 in Alfred, New York, by the Seventh Day Baptists, being elevated to an Academy in 1842. Motivated to organize a theological seminary, they worked to obtain a university license. In 1857 they finally obtained a license and the Department of Theology was created at the then Alfred University.

In 1857 the Seventh Day Baptist Church finally obtained a license and the Department of Theology was created at the then Alfred University. The former Milton College began operating as a school in 1844, being incorporated into the Wisconsin legislature in 1848 as Academy DuLac, offering high school courses concurrently with Higher Education. The academy progressed to the point of becoming a college in 1867. The college had clear connections with the USA's Seventh Day Baptist Church that offered operational support.

A school was founded in Salem, West Virginia, after the Eastern Seventh Day Baptist Association decided to build an academy in the area. The state granted a permit in December 1888 to build what was called the Academy of Salem, specifying that the institution was subject to the regulations and decisions of the Society of Seventh Day Baptist Education. The charter required the institution to make a college as soon as possible, which occurred in 1890. Until 1992, a close relationship between Seventh Day Baptists and the Salem University still existed.

It is not the case that the Seventh-day Adventists (SDAs), established in 1863, are a "splinter group" of the Seventh Day Baptist, at least not in the sense that they broke away from their church and formed the SDAs. But there was a connection and an influence. Rachel Oakes Preston (1809–1868) a Seventh Day Baptist from Verona, New York, brought Seventh Day teaching to a small Millerite group that became the SDAs in Washington, New Hampshire. Through her influence, Frederick Wheeler became the first SDA preacher. One family, the Cottrells, looked favorably upon William Miller's Second Advent message but did not join the movement prior to 1844 because it did not acknowledge the seventh-day Sabbath. After a group of Adventists accepted the Sabbath, the Cottrells joined them. Later on, in the 1860s and '70s, the leadership of the two organizations associated with each other. They recognized their common interest in promoting Sabbath observance. Adventist pioneer James Springer White went so far as to advise Adventist preachers not to conduct evangelistic campaigns in the small towns with a Seventh Day Baptist presence.

By 2017, Seventh Day Baptists had 81 churches including those located in the U.S. and Canada. Seventh Day Baptist churches are present in all regions of the United States, with a greater presence in the Northeast and Southern regions of the United States.

== Statement of Belief ==
Seventh Day Baptists consider liberty of thought under the guidance of the Holy Spirit to be essential to Christian belief and practice. Therefore we encourage the unhindered study and open discussion of Scripture. We uphold the individual’s freedom of conscience in seeking to determine and obey the will of God. The following statement is not intended to be exhaustive, but is an expression of our common belief, which is derived from our understanding of Scripture (2 Corinthians 3:17–18; 2 Timothy 2:15; Romans 12:2; Ephesians 4:3–6, 15; Romans 10:17; 2 Timothy 3:16–17).

God

We believe in one God, infinite and perfect, the Creator and Sustainer of the universe who exists eternally in three persons—Father, Son, and Holy Spirit—and desires to share His love in a personal relationship with everyone (1 Timothy 1:17; Deuteronomy 6:4; 1 Kings 8:27; 1 John 1:5; Genesis 1:1-2; Acts 17:24-25, 28; Psalm 90:1-2; Matthew 28:19; John 3:16; Isaiah 57:15; 2 Peter 3:9).

The Father

We believe in God the Father, who is sovereign over all, and is loving and just as He forgives the repentant and condemns the unrepentant (1 Corinthians 8:6; Ephesians 4:6; Ezekiel 33:11; 2 Thessalonians 1:6-8; John 5:24; John 3:16-18).

The Son

We believe in God the Son, who became incarnate in Jesus Christ, our Lord and Savior. He gave Himself on the cross as the complete and final sacrifice for sin. As our Risen Lord, He is the mediator between God the Father and mankind. We believe that Jesus Christ, in keeping with His promise, will return suddenly, personally and visibly, at a time known only by God (John 1:34; Hebrews 1:3; John 1:14-18; Romans 1:3-4; 1 John 3:16; 1 Peter 2:24; Hebrews 10:10-14; 1 Corinthians 15:20-21; 1 Timothy 2:5; John 14:6; 1 John 2:1-2; Mark 13:32-33; Revelation 22:7, 12, 20).

The Holy Spirit

We believe in God the Holy Spirit, the Comforter, who gives spiritual birth to believers, lives within them, and empowers them for witnessing and service. We believe the Holy Spirit inspired the Scriptures, convicts of sin and instructs in righteousness (John 14:16; 3:5-8; 14:17; Romans 5:5; 1 Corinthians 12:4-7; 2 Peter 1:20-21; John 16:7-11).

The Bible

We believe that the Bible is the inspired Word of God and is our final authority in matters of faith and practice. We believe that Jesus Christ, in His life and teachings as recorded in the Bible, is the supreme interpreter of God’s will for mankind (2 Peter 1:20-21; Romans 3:2; 2 Peter 3:1-2, 15-16; 2 Timothy 3:14-17; Matthew 5:17-19; Psalm 119:105; John 20:30-31; Hebrews 1:1-2).

Mankind

We believe that mankind was created in the image of God and is therefore the noblest work of creation. We believe that human beings have moral responsibility and are created to enjoy both divine and human fellowship as children of God (Genesis 1:26-27; Psalm 8:3-9; Micah 6:8; Matthew 5:44-48; 1 John 1:3; John 1:12).

Sin and Salvation

We believe that sin is disobedience to God and failure to live according to His will. Because of sin all people have separated themselves from God. We believe that because we are sinners, we are in need of a Savior. We believe that salvation from sin and death is the gift of God by redeeming love accomplished by Christ’s death and resurrection, and is received only by repentance and faith in Him. We believe that all who repent of their sin and receive Christ as Savior will not be punished at the final judgment but enjoy eternal life (1 John 3:4-5; Romans 3:23-25; Isaiah 59:2; 1 John 1:8-10; Romans 5:6-8; Romans 6:23; Hebrews 10:10-14; 1 Peter 1:3; John 3:16-18, 36; Ephesians 2:8-9; John 14:6; Matthew 25:41-46; Romans 5:10).

Eternal Life

We believe that Jesus rose from the dead and lives eternally with the Father, and that He will come again with power and great glory. We believe that eternal life begins in knowing God through a commitment to Jesus Christ. We believe that because He died and lives again, resurrection with spiritual and imperishable bodies is the gift of God to believers (1 Corinthians 15:3-4, 20-23; John 14:1-3; Matthew 24:30; Titus 2:13; John 17:3; 1 John 5:11-13; 1 Corinthians 15:42-44; John 10:27-28; John 6:40).

The Church

We believe that the church of God is all believers gathered by the Holy Spirit and joined into one body, of which Christ is the Head. We believe that the local church is a community of believers organized in covenant relationship for worship, fellowship and service, practicing and proclaiming common convictions, while growing in grace and in the knowledge of our Lord and Savior Jesus Christ. We believe in the priesthood of all believers and practice the autonomy of the local congregation, as we seek to work in association with others for more effective witness (Acts 20:28; 1 Corinthians 12:13, 14, 27; Romans 12:4-5; Colossians 1:18; Acts 2:42; Ephesians 2:19-22; Romans 15:5-7; Ephesians 4:11-16; 2 Peter 3:18; 1 Peter 2:4-10; Matthew 18:20; Hebrews 10:24-25).

Baptism

We believe that baptism of believers in obedience to Christ’s command is a witness to the acceptance of Jesus Christ as Savior and Lord. We believe in baptism by immersion as a symbol of death to sin, a pledge to a new life in Him (Romans 6:3-4; Matthew 28:19-20; Acts 2:41; Colossians 2:12; Romans 6:11; Galatians 3:26-27).

The Lord’s Supper

We believe that the Lord’s Supper commemorates the suffering and death of our Redeemer until He comes, and is a symbol of union in Christ and a pledge of renewed allegiance to our risen Lord (Mark 14:22-25; Matthew 26:26-29; 1 Corinthians 10:16-17, 11:23-30).

Sabbath

We believe that the Sabbath of the Bible, the seventh day of the week, is sacred time, a gift of God to all people, instituted at creation, affirmed in the Ten Commandments and reaffirmed in the teaching and example of Jesus and the apostles. We believe that the gift of Sabbath rest is an experience of God’s eternal presence with His people. We believe that in obedience to God and in loving response to His grace in Christ, the Sabbath should be faithfully observed as a day of rest, worship, and celebration (Genesis 2:2–3; Exodus 16:23–30; Exodus 20:8–11; Matthew 5:17–19; Mark 2:27–28; Luke 4:16; Acts 13:14, 42–44; 16:11–13; 17:2–3; 18:4–11; Ezekiel 20:19–20; Hebrews 4:9–10; John 14:15; Isaiah 58:13–14; Luke 23:56).

Evangelism

We believe that Jesus Christ commissions us to proclaim the Gospel, to make disciples, to baptize and to teach observance of all that He has commanded. We are called to be witnesses for Christ throughout the world and in all human relationships (Matthew 24:14; Acts 1:8; Matthew 28:18–20; 2 Corinthians 4:1–2, 5–6; 1 Peter 3:15; 2 Corinthians 5:17–20; Ephesians 6:14–20).

== Seventh Day Baptist World Federation ==
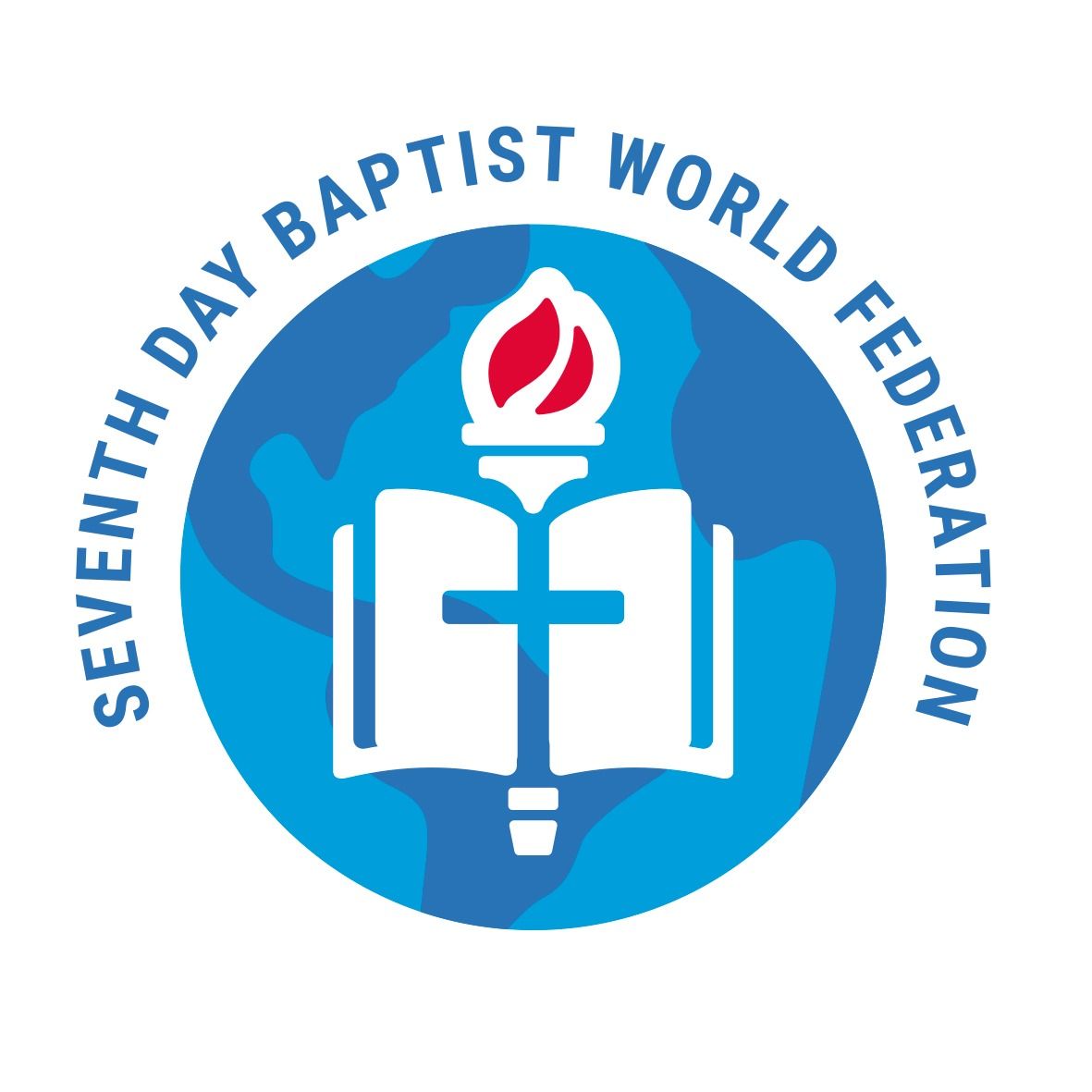
Seventh Day Baptist World Federation logo

The idea of a worldwide Seventh Day Baptist Association was considered by Everett Harris of the United States and Gerben Zijlstra of the Netherlands. After the exposition of the idea by both at a meeting of representatives of Baptist conferences of the seventh day, the federation was founded in 1965, by Baptist conferences of the seventh day of 11 countries, later expanding to 20 countries.

The Seventh Day Baptist World Federation is a federation that brings together Seventh Day Baptist associations around the world that cooperate with the federation's purpose of providing greater communication between Seventh Day Baptists; promote projects of mutual interest that benefit from international cooperation; and encourage fellowship among Seventh Day Baptist Christians; among other purposes. According to a Seventh Day Baptist Historical Library & Archives estimate published in 2017, it has 20 member denominations and 50,000 baptized members. It is conducted by elected officials who perform functions in accordance with their established constitution. Representatives meet to share unity and discuss topics relevant to Seventh Day Baptist churches.

== See also ==
- Biblical Sabbath
- Sabbath in seventh-day churches
- Shabbat
- Seventh Day Baptist Missionary Society
