= Jiufeng =

Jiufeng may refer to:

- Jiufeng (九鳳; Jiǔfèng) or Nine-headed Bird, a mythological bird worshiped in the ancient state of Chu
- Jiufeng, Fujian, town in Pinghe County, Fujian, China
- Jiufeng, Guangdong, town in Lechang, Guangdong, China
- Jiufeng, Shaanxi, town in Zhouzhi County, Shaanxi, China
- Jiufeng Subdistrict, Pu'an County, Guizhou, China
- Jiufeng Subdistrict, Wuhan, in Hongshan District, Wuhan, Hubei, China
