= Sutra on the Origin of Origins =

The Sutra on the Origin of Origins may refer to:

- The Jingjiao Documents
- The Nestorian pillar of Luoyang
- The Church of the East in China
