= Buddhism and Christianity =

Comparison of the belief systems

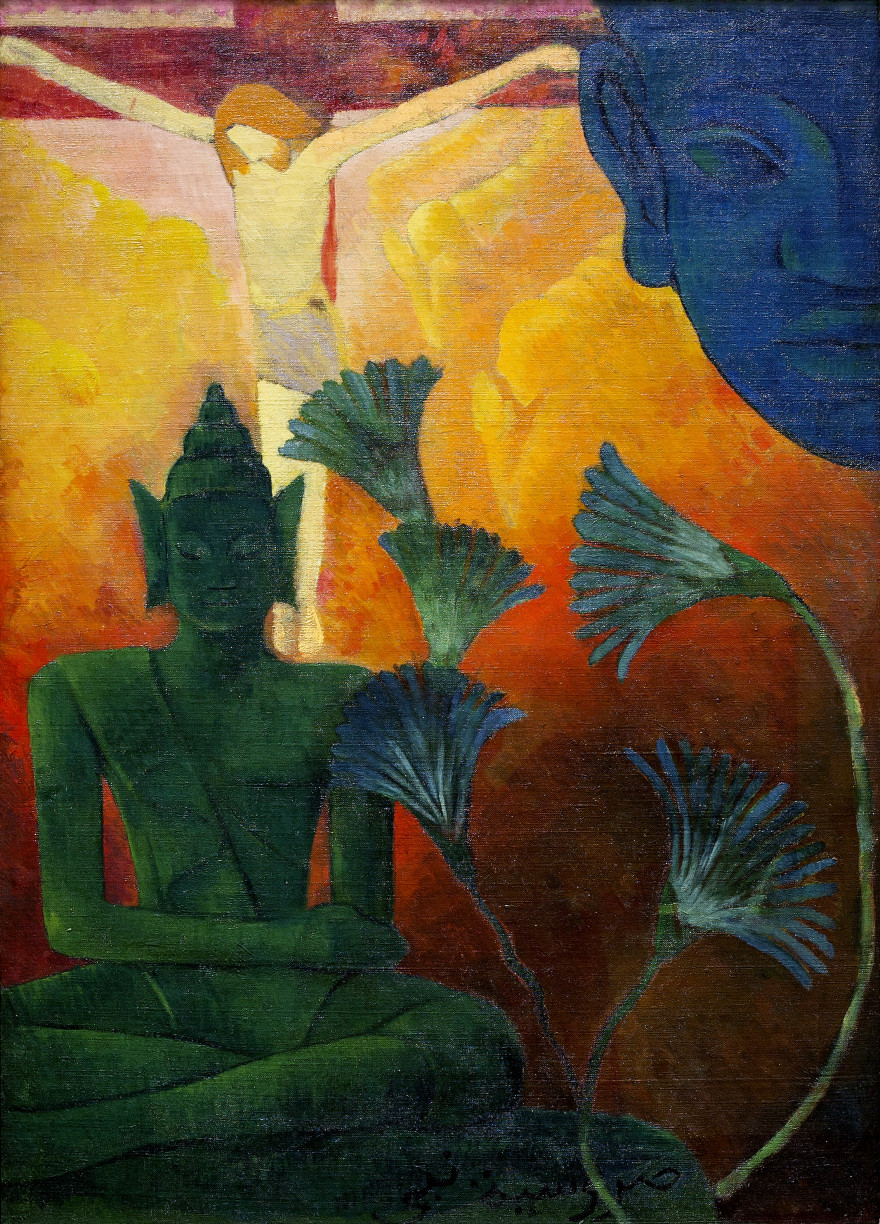
Christ and Buddha by Paul Ranson, 1880

Buddhism and Christianity are the world’s fourth-largest and largest religions, with approximately 510 million and 2.3 billion followers, respectively. There were links between Buddhism and the pre-Christian Mediterranean world, with Buddhist missionaries sent by Emperor Ashoka of India to Syria, Egypt and Greece from 250 BC. Significant differences between the two religions include monotheism in Christianity and Buddhism's orientation towards nontheism (the lack of relevancy of the existence of a Creator Deity) which runs counter to teachings about God in Christianity, and grace in Christianity against the rejection of interference with karma in Theravada Buddhism on.

Some early Christians were aware of Buddhism which was practiced in both the Greek and Roman Empires in the pre-Christian period. The majority of modern Christian scholarship rejects any historical basis for the travels of Jesus to India or Tibet and has seen the attempts at parallel symbolism as cases of parallelomania which exaggerate resemblances. However, in the East, syncretism between Nestorian Christianity and Buddhism was widespread along the Silk Road in Antiquity and the Middle Ages, and was especially pronounced in the medieval Church of the East in China, as evidenced by the Jesus Sutras.

== Origins and early contacts ==
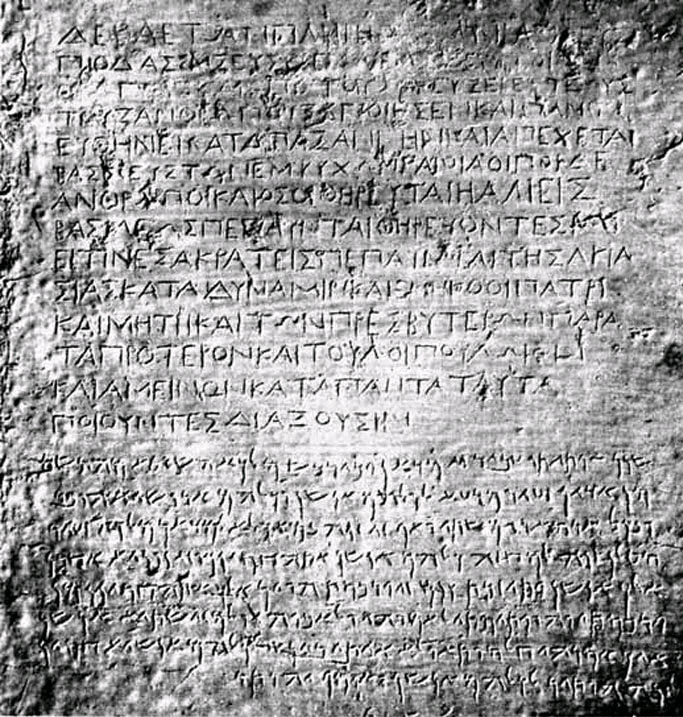
Bilingual edict (Greek and Aramaic) 3rd century BC by Indian Buddhist King Ashoka, see Edicts of Ashoka, from Kandahar. This edict advocates the adoption of "godliness" using the Greek term Eusebeia for Dharma. Kabul Museum.

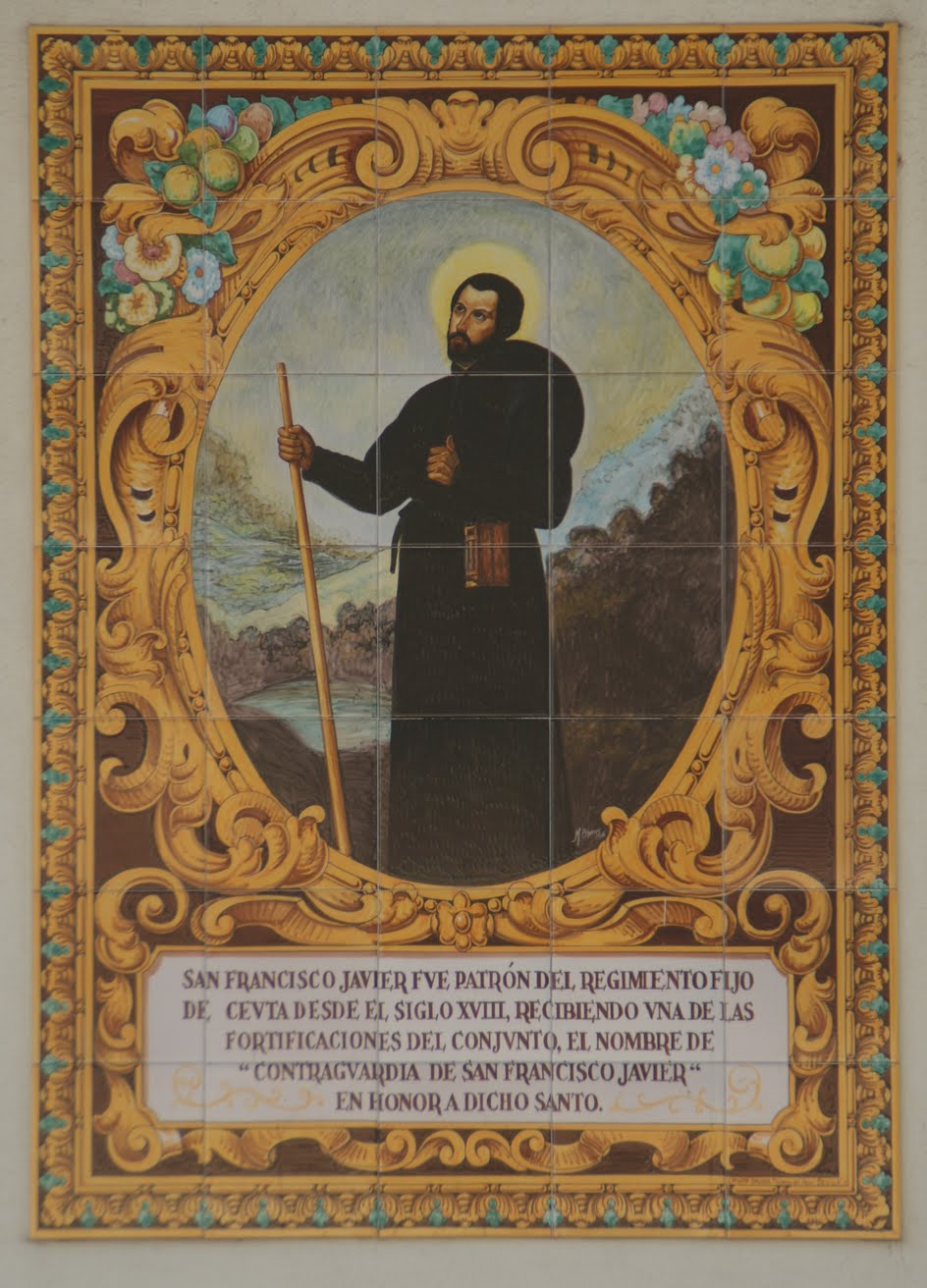
Mosaic of early missionary to the East St. Francis Xavier

The history of Buddhism goes back to what is now Lumbini, Nepal almost six centuries before Christianity, making it one of the oldest religions still being practiced. The origins of Christianity go back to Roman Judea in the early first century. The four canonical gospels date from around 70–90 AD, the Pauline epistles having been written before them around 50–60 AD.

Starting in the 1930s, authors such as Will Durant suggested that Greco-Buddhist representatives of Ashoka the Great who traveled to ancient Syria, Egypt and Greece may have helped prepare the ground for Christian teaching. Buddhism was prominent in the eastern Greek world and became the official religion of the eastern Greek successor kingdoms to Alexander the Great's empire (Greco-Bactrian Kingdom (250 BC – 125 BC) and Indo-Greek Kingdom (180 BC – 10 AD)). Several prominent Greek Buddhist missionaries are known (Mahadharmaraksita and Dharmaraksita) and the Indo-Greek king Menander I converted to Buddhism, and is regarded as one of the great patrons of Buddhism. (See Milinda Panha.) Some modern historians have suggested that the pre-Christian monastic order in Egypt of the Therapeutae is possibly a deformation of the Pāli word "Theravāda", a form of Buddhism, and the movement may have "almost entirely drawn (its) inspiration from the teaching and practices of Buddhist asceticism". They may even have been descendants of Asoka's emissaries to the West.

Buddhist gravestones from the Ptolemaic period have been found in Alexandria in Egypt decorated with depictions of the dharma wheel, showing that Buddhists were living in Hellenistic Egypt at the time Christianity began. The presence of Buddhists in Alexandria has led one author to note: "It was later in this very place that some of the most active centers of Christianity were established." Nevertheless, modern Christian scholars generally hold that there is no direct evidence of any influence of Buddhism on Christianity, and several scholarly theological works do not support these suggestions. However, some historians such as Jerry H. Bentley suggest that there is a real possibility that Buddhism influenced the early development of Christianity.

It is known that prominent early Christians were aware of Buddha and some Buddhist stories. Saint Jerome (4th century AD) mentions the birth of the Buddha, who he says "was born from the side of a virgin." The early church father Clement of Alexandria (died 215 AD) was also aware of Buddha, writing in his Stromata (Bk I, Ch XV): "The Indian gymnosophists are also in the number, and the other barbarian philosophers. And of these there are two classes, some of them called Sarmanæ and others Brahmins. And those of the Sarmanæ who are called 'Hylobii' neither inhabit cities, nor have roofs over them, but are clothed in the bark of trees, feed on nuts, and drink water in their hands. Like those called Encratites in the present day, they know not marriage nor begetting of children. Some, too, of the Indians obey the precepts of Buddha (Βούττα) whom, on account of his extraordinary sanctity, they have raised to divine honours."

In the Middle Ages there was no trace of Buddhism in the West. In the 13th century, international travelers, such as Giovanni de Piano Carpini and William of Ruysbroeck, sent back reports of Buddhism to the West and noted some similarities with Nestorian Christian communities. Indeed, syncretism in the East between Nestorian Christianity and Buddhism existed along the Silk Road throughout Antiquity and the Middle Ages, and was especially pronounced in the medieval Church of the East in China, as evidenced by the Jesus Sutras.

When European Christians made more direct contact with Buddhism in the early 16th century, Catholic missionaries such as St. Francis Xavier sent back accounts of Buddhist practices. With the arrival of Sanskrit studies in European universities in the late 18th century, and the subsequent availability of Buddhist texts, a discussion began of a proper encounter with Buddhism. In time, Buddhism gathered Western followers and at the end of the 19th century the first Westerners (e.g. Sir Edwin Arnold and Henry Olcott) converted to Buddhism. In the beginning of the 20th century the first westerners (e.g. Ananda Metteyya and Nyanatiloka) entered the Buddhist monastic life.

== Similarities and differences ==
There are significant similarities and differences between the two religions, related to their view of ethics, God, and prayer.

=== Similarities ===
In the 19th century, some scholars began to perceive similarities between Buddhist and Christian practices. In 1878, T.W. Rhys Davids wrote that the earliest missionaries to Tibet observed that similarities have been seen since the first known contact. In 1880, Ernest De Bunsen made similar observations in that with the exception of the death of Jesus on the cross, and of the Christian doctrine of atonement, the most ancient Buddhist records had similarities with the Christian traditions.

Late in the 20th century, historian Jerry H. Bentley also wrote of similarities and stated that it is possible "that Buddhism influenced the early development of Christianity" and suggested "attention to many parallels concerning the births, lives, doctrines, and deaths of the Buddha and Jesus". Some high level Buddhists have drawn analogies between Jesus and Buddhism, e.g. in 2001 the Dalai Lama stated that "Jesus Christ also lived previous lives", and added that "So, you see, he reached a high state, either as a Bodhisattva, or an enlightened person, through Buddhist practice or something like that." Vietnamese Buddhist monk Thich Nhat Hanh affirmed core Christian beliefs such as the trinity, and the death and resurrection of Jesus Christ, in his book Living Buddha, Living Christ. Bokin Kim, similarly, sees Christ as the Buddha Dharmakaya, and Jesus as similar to Gautama who was just a historical manifestation of the transhistorical Buddha. In The Lotus & The Rose: A Conversation Between Tibetan Buddhism & Mystical Christianity, Lama Tsomo and Matthew Fox discuss the interconnections between Buddhism and Christianity. In it, Fox relates the Buddha-nature to what scholars John Dominic Crossan and Bruce Chilton call Paul's original "cosmic" or "metacosmic" view of Christ.

=== Differences ===
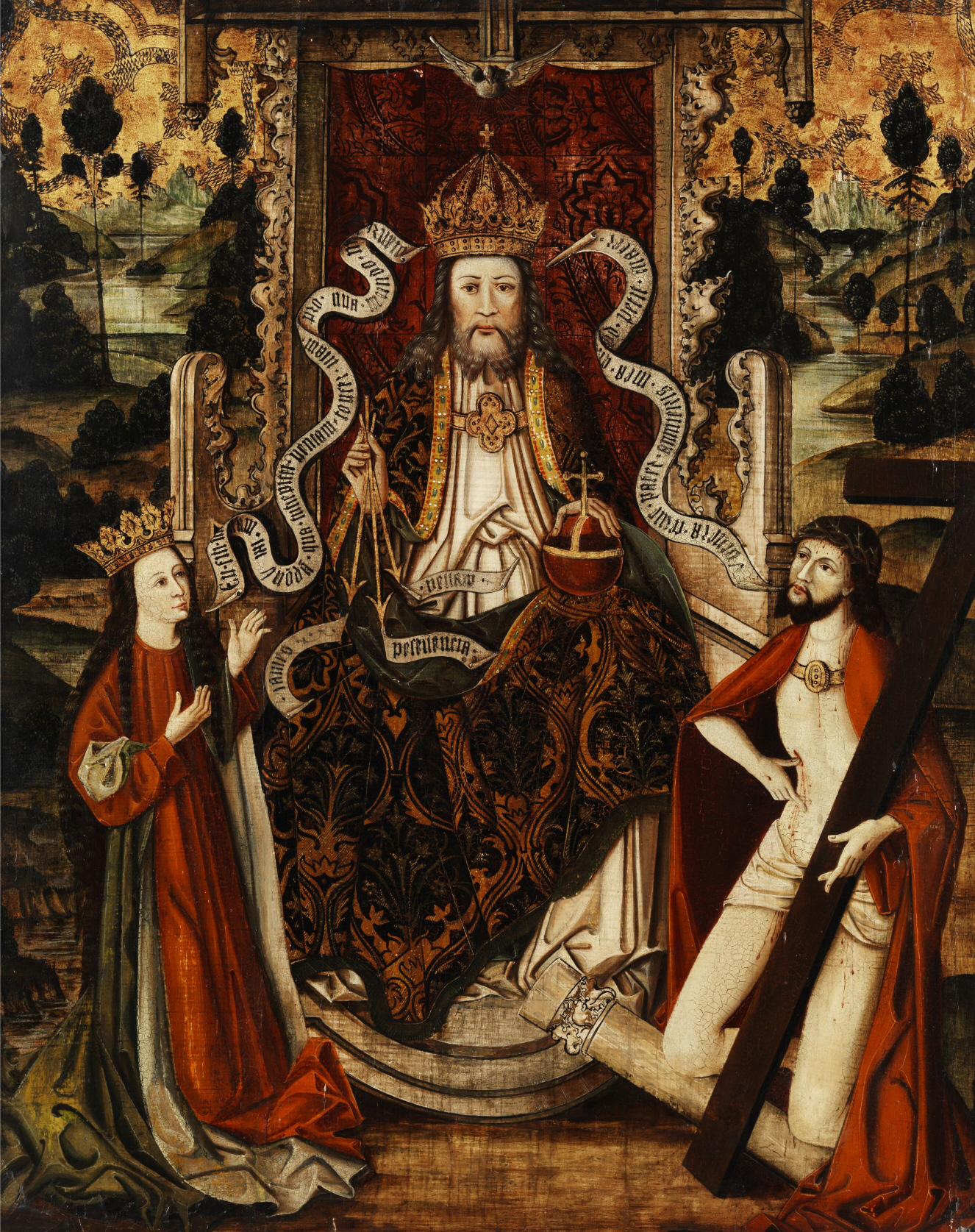
God the Father on a throne, Westphalia, Germany, late 15th century.

There are inherent and fundamental differences between Buddhism and Christianity, one significant element being that while Christianity is at its core monotheistic and relies on a God as a Creator, Buddhism is generally non-theistic and rejects the notion of a Creator which provides divine values for the world.

The Nicene Creed, currently the most widely used Christian creed, states that "We believe in one God, the Father Almighty, Maker of heaven and earth, and of all things visible and invisible". However, the notion of theistic creation is generally foreign to Buddhist thought, and the question of the existence of God is perhaps one of the most fundamental barriers between the teachings of Christianity and Buddhism. Although Mahayana Buddhism expresses belief in the saint-like state of a Bodhisattva, this is very different from the notion of Creator God in Christianity. While some variations of Buddhism believe in an impersonal eternal Buddha or trikaya, in general Buddhism sees empty space as eternal and without a starting point of creation. According to the Dalai Lama, belief in a Creator could be associated with the understanding of emptiness, but "once a certain degree of realization has been reached, a choice between the two paths will become necessary."

According to the Oxford Handbook of Eschatology, there are inherent differences in the Christian and Buddhist beliefs regarding the End Times and eschatology. Jan Nattier states that while Buddhism has a notion of "relative eschatology" that refers to specific cycles of life, the term "Buddhist eschatology" does not relate to any "final things", or that the world will end one day – Buddhist scripture routinely referring to the "beginningless Saṃsāra" as a never ending cycle of birth and death with no starting point. However, Christian eschatology directly involves the concept of "end to all creation" at the Last Judgement when the world will reach its conclusion.

There are other fundamental incompatibilities; e.g., while grace is part of the very fabric of Christian theology, in Theravada Buddhism no deity can interfere with karma, and hence the notion of any type of grace is inadmissible within these teachings. Mahayana Buddhism however, differs on this issue. Pure Land Buddhism emphasizes that salvation can be attained not through individual effort or accumulation of merit but through the grace of the Amitabha Buddha.

The crucifixion of Jesus as a single event in history that acts for the atonement of sins is a central element of Christian belief. This, however, produces a strong difference between Christian and Buddhist teachings. Buddhist scholar Masao Abe pointed out that while "the event of the Cross" is central to Christianity, it is not possible for Buddhism to accept its importance. Buddhist philosopher D. T. Suzuki stated that every time he saw a crucifixion scene it reminded him of the "gap that lies deep" between Christianity and Buddhism.

== Buddhist influence on Christianity ==
=== Suggestions of influences ===
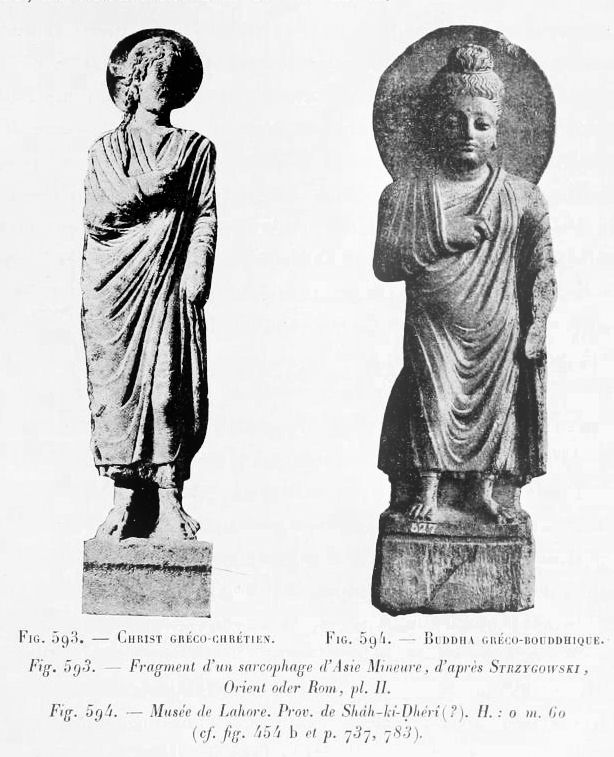
Early depictions of Christ (left, Asia Minor, Roman period), and the Buddha (Greco-Buddhist art of Gandhara).

Suggestions have been made that Buddhism may have influenced early Christianity. Buddhist missionaries, sent by Emperor Ashoka of India to Sri Lanka, Syria, Egypt and Greece, may have helped prepare for the ethics of Christ. Gnostics (a small number of sects) are not considered part of mainstream Christianity and some have been declared heretical. However, Elaine Pagels proposes Buddhist influences on Gnosticism. Pagels suggested that there are parallels with teachings attributed to Jesus Christ and teachings found in Eastern traditions, but concludes that these parallels might be coincidental, since parallel traditions may emerge in different cultures without direct influence.

Buddhist Jack Maguire has suggested that in the 4th century, Christian monasticism developed in Egypt, and it emerged with a corresponding structure comparable to the Buddhist monasticism of its time and place. In Alexandria, Indian gravestones dating from the Ptolemaic period (c. 305 BC – 30 BC) have been discovered in Alexandria. Alexandria served as the Ptolemaic trading centre between the Mediterranean Sea and the Indian subcontinent, later encompassing "some of the most active centers of Christianity" and becoming the third-most important seat of Christianity in the world.

After studying Eastern philosophy, German philosopher Arthur Schopenhauer states that "[the] New Testament must be of Indian origin [...] Everything true in Christianity is also to be discovered in Brahmanism and Buddhism," theorizing that after the flight into Egypt, Jesus was "brought up by Egyptian priests, whose religion was of Indian origin." Schopenhauer elaborates:

[When] this Indian doctrine entered into the Promised Land there arose the task of uniting the knowledge of the corruption and misery of the world, of its need for redemption and of salvation through an avatar, together with the morality of self-denial and atonement, with Jewish monotheism and its 'Behold, it was very good'.

The suggestion that an adult Jesus traveled to India and was influenced by Buddhism before starting his ministry in Galilee was first made by Nicolas Notovitch in 1894 in the book The Unknown Life of Jesus Christ which was widely disseminated and became the basis of other theories. Notovitch's theory was controversial from the beginning and was widely criticized. Once his story had been re-examined by historians, Notovitch confessed to having fabricated the evidence.

=== Rejection of influences ===
A number of scholars have stated that suggestions of an influence from Buddhism on Christianity, particularly Jesus's alleged travels to Buddhist India, are fanciful and without any historical basis:

- Robert Van Voorst states that modern Christian scholarship has "almost unanimously agreed" that claims of the travels of Jesus to Tibet, Kashmir or India contain "nothing of value".
- Marcus Borg states "Scholars have pointed out that Buddhist teachers lived in Alexandria, on the Mediterranean coast, by the first century. Some have posited that Jesus might have traveled there, or that Buddhist teachings may have reached cities of the Jewish homeland, including Sepphoris, a major city in Galilee only four miles from Nazareth. Popular speculation speaks of Jesus having traveled to India during "the missing years", the decades before he emerged on the stage of history. There, it is suggested, he came in to contact with Buddhist teachings. But both explanations are unlikely and unnecessary. The similarities are not of the kind that suggest cultural borrowing".
- Leslie Houlden states that although modern parallels between the teachings of Jesus and Buddha have been drawn, these comparisons emerged after missionary contacts in the 19th century and there is no historically reliable evidence of contacts between Buddhism and Jesus.
- Paula Fredriksen states that no serious scholarly work places Jesus outside the backdrop of 1st century Palestinian Judaism.
- Eddy and Boyd state that there is no evidence of a historical influence by outside sources on the authors of the New Testament, and most scholars agree that any such historical influence on Christianity is entirely implausible given that first century monotheistic Galilean Jews would not have been open to what they would have seen as pagan stories.

== Christian influence on Buddhism ==
Christian influence on Buddhism in the 18th and 19th centuries was primarily by example of modern forms of religious education. During the last centuries, Christian missionaries have influenced many Buddhist groups such as the Buddhist nun Cheng Yen who, after being inspired by the humanitarian aid done by Catholic nuns, decided that Buddhists need "to do more than simply encourage the private cultivation of people's souls". Her works eventually led to the foundation of Tzu Chi, a non-profit humanitarian group in Asia.

== Contemporary Buddhist–Christian exchange ==
“Ask and it shall be given, seek and ye shall find, knock and it shall be opened unto you. For everyone that asketh receiveth, and he that seeketh findeth, and to him that knocketh, it shall be opened.”
Gasan remarked: “That is excellent. Whoever said that is not far from Buddhahood.”

— Paul Reps, Zen Flesh, Zen Bones

=== Attempts at convergence ===
Buddhism has been gaining popularity in the west. Starting with a cultural and academic elite in the 19th century, it is now widespread in western culture, especially since the 1960s.

In the 20th century Christian monastics such as Thomas Merton, Wayne Teasdale, David Steindl-Rast and the former nun Karen Armstrong, and Buddhist monastics such as Ajahn Buddhadasa, Thich Nhat Hanh and the Dalai Lama have taken part in an interfaith dialogue about Buddhism and Christianity. This dialogue aims to shed light on the common ground between Buddhism and Christianity. The DIMMID (Dialogue Interreligieux Monastique - Monastic Interreligious Dialogue) has hosted several encounters between Buddhist and Catholic monks, such as the Gethsemani Encounters at the Abbey of Our Lady of Gethsemani which were attended also by the Dalai Lama, as well as exchange programs in which Buddhist monks and nuns visit Catholic monasteries and vice versa.

Although the prevalent romantic view on Buddhism sees it as an authentic and ancient practice, contemporary Buddhism is deeply influenced by the western culture. With the rise of western colonialism in the 19th century, Asian cultures and religions developed strategies to adapt to the western hegemony, without losing their own traditions. Western discourses were taken over, and western polemic styles were applied to defend indigenous traditions.

=== Rejection of convergence ===
In 1989 the Catholic Church, through the Congregation for the Doctrine of the Faith, rejected attempts at mixing some aspects of Christian and Buddhist practices, in a letter titled "Letter to the Bishops of the Catholic Church on some aspects of Christian meditation", generally known as the Aspects of Christian meditation letter.

The document issues warnings on differences and potential incompatibilities between Christian meditation and the styles of meditation used in eastern religions such as Buddhism. Referring to some elements of Buddhism as "negative theology" the document states:

Still others do not hesitate to place that absolute without image or concepts, which is proper to Buddhist theory, on the same level as the majesty of God revealed in Christ, which towers above finite reality. To this end, they make use of a "negative theology", which ... denies that the things of this world can offer traces of the infinity of God.

Similar warnings were issued in 2003 in A Christian reflection on the New Age which also referred to Buddhism. The Southern Baptist Convention expressed agreement with those views.

=== Buddhist views of Christianity ===
Buddhist views on Christianity vary. Regarding Jesus, in Theravāda Buddhism, there is a spectrum of views ranging from the demonization of Jesus to recognition or even admiration of him. The colonial experiences of Christianity inform the perspectives that demonize Jesus. This view spread through the Carpenter-Heretic folktale, the nineteenth century Buddhist-Christian debates, and the writings of the Buddhist reformer Anagarika Dharmapala and the scholar Gunapala Dharmasiri. On the other end of the spectrum, some Theravāda Buddhists regard Jesus as an ethical teacher, spiritual master, or even a Buddha himself. Lily de Silva, the Thai reformer Ajahn Buddhadasa, and the German-born nun Ayya Khema have promoted these views.

== See also ==
- Barlaam and Josaphat
- Buddhism and Western Philosophy
- Buddhist-Christian Studies (journal)
- List of American Buddhists
- Christianity in Asia
- Index of Buddhism-related articles
- Jingjiao Documents
- List of converts to Buddhism from Christianity
- Meister Eckhart
- Nestorian Stele
- Persecution of Buddhists by Christians
- Philipp Mainländer
- Secular Buddhism
- The Good Heart – A Buddhist Perspective on the Teachings of Jesus
