= Ren Farong =

Chinese Taoist priest (1936–2021)

- 任法融
- Title: Venerable Master of the Chinese Taoist Association

Personal life
- Born: Ren Zhigang; June 1936 Tianshui County, Gansu, China
- Died: May 26, 2021 (aged 84) Xi'an, Shaanxi, China

Religious life
- Religion: Taoism
- Temple: Louguantai
- School: Quanzhen School
- Sect: Dragon Gate Taoism

Senior posting
- Teacher: Wang Silin
- Period in office: 2005–2015
- Predecessor: Min Zhiting
- Successor: Li Guangfu

Ren Farong (Chinese: 任法融; pinyin: Rén Fǎróng; June 1936 – 26 May 2021) was a Chinese Taoist priest, religious leader, calligrapher, philanthropist, and politician. He was Venerable Master of the Chinese Taoist Association between 2005 and 2015. He was president of the World Religious Peace Association, vice president of the China Religious Peace Committee, president of the Chinese Taoist College, president of Shaanxi Taoist Association, honorary president of Shanxi Taoist Association, vice minister of the State Ethnic Affairs Commission, and abbot of Louguantai. He was a member of the 8th, 9th, 10th National Committee of the Chinese People's Political Consultative Conference. He was a member of the 11th and 12th Standing Committee of the Chinese People's Political Consultative Conference.

== Biography ==
Ren was born Ren Zhigang (任志刚) in the town of Xinyang, Tianshui County (now Tianshui), Gansu, in June 1936. At age 19, he paid a religious homage to the Temple of King of Medicine, from then on, he yearned for Taoism. Soon, he received complete ordination under Taoist priest Wang Silin (王嗣琳), a 28th generation disciple of Quanzhen School. In 1984, he was proposed as the new abbot of Louguantai, one of the 72 blessed places of Taoism. In 1986, he became president of Shaanxi Taoist Association. On June 24, 2005, he was elected Venerable Master of the Chinese Taoist Association. On 26 May 2021, he died of illness in Xi'an, Shaanxi, aged 84.

== Works ==
- 道德经释义 [Interpretation of Tao Te Ching] (in Chinese). Oriental Publishing House: Shanghai. 2020. ISBN 9787506046022.
- 黄帝阴符经·黄石公素书释义 [Interpretation of Huangdi Yinfujing and Sushu] (in Chinese). Oriental Publishing House: Shanghai. 2012. ISBN 9787506045742.
- 周易参同契释义 [Interpretation of the Book of Changes and Can Tong Qi] (in Chinese). Oriental Publishing House: Shanghai. 2012. ISBN 9787506045773.

Religious titles
Preceded by Min Zhiting	Venerable Master of the Chinese Taoist Association; 2005–2015	Succeeded by Li Guangfu
