= The Good Heart – A Buddhist Perspective on the Teachings of Jesus =

1996 book by Tenzin Gyatso (14th Dali Lama)

- Author: Tenzin Gyatso, 14th Dalai Lama
- Translator: Thupten Jinpa
- Language: English
- Subject: Religion, Interfaith Dialogue, Christianity, Buddhism
- Genre: Non-fiction, Religious Studies
- Publisher: Wisdom Publications
- Publication date: 1996
- Publication place: United States
- English publication date: 1996
- Media type: Print (Paperback, Hardcover)
- Pages: 224
- ISBN: 978-0861711383

The Good Heart – A Buddhist Perspective on the Teachings of Jesus is a 1996 book in which the 14th Dalai Lama, presents his reflections on the teachings of Jesus from a Buddhist perspective. Published by Wisdom Publications, the book is based on the Dalai Lama's 1994 seminar at the John Main, a form of “Christian meditation” associated with the Benedictine order. During the seminar, he offered commentary on eight passages from four canonical Gospels.

The book draws parallels between Jesus and Gautama Buddha and examines the similarities and differences between their respective religious traditions. The Dalai Lama emphasizes both the shared values and unique qualities of the world’s major religions, encouraging readers to appreciate the choices available to them. One of the seminar’s aims was to foster Christian–Buddhist interfaith dialogue.

== Summary ==
The book presents the 14th Dalai Lama Tenzin Gyatso’s reflections on the teachings of Jesus from a Buddhist perspective. The book is based on the proceedings of the John Main Seminar, held at Middlesex University in London in September 1994, which brought together approximately 350 Christian meditation practitioners and Buddhist participants. The seminar was co-led by the Dalai Lama and Benedictine monk Laurence Freeman, emphasizing interfaith dialogue and mutual understanding.

In the text, the Dalai Lama comments on eight selected passages from the four Gospels, including the Sermon on the Mount, the Parable of the Mustard Seed, the resurrection, teaching on loving one’s enemies, the Kingdom of God, the transfiguration, the mission, and faith. He draws parallels between the ethical and spiritual teachings of Jesus and the moral principles in Buddhism, highlighting shared values such as compassion, nonviolence, and selflessness, while also recognizing and respecting doctrinal and ritual differences.

The book provides detailed contextual explanations for each passage. Laurence Freeman supplies the Christian interpretation of the Gospel passages, while Geshe Thupten Jinpa, the Dalai Lama’s principal English translator, provides insights into Buddhist understanding and philosophy. This approach allows readers to appreciate both traditions and fosters dialogue between Buddhism and Christianity.

Throughout the work, the Dalai Lama emphasizes the importance of religious diversity, mutual respect, and interfaith collaboration. He encourages understanding rather than conversion or syncretism, illustrating that spiritual enrichment can be gained from multiple traditions without compromising the integrity of each. The seminar format includes the Dalai Lama’s lectures followed by interactive discussions with Laurence Freeman, invited scholars, and attendees, highlighting practical engagement with interfaith issues.

The book concludes with a reflective commentary titled “Tibet since the Chinese occupation in 1950,” examining the ongoing struggles and resilience of Tibetan culture, religion, and people under political challenges.

== Legacy ==
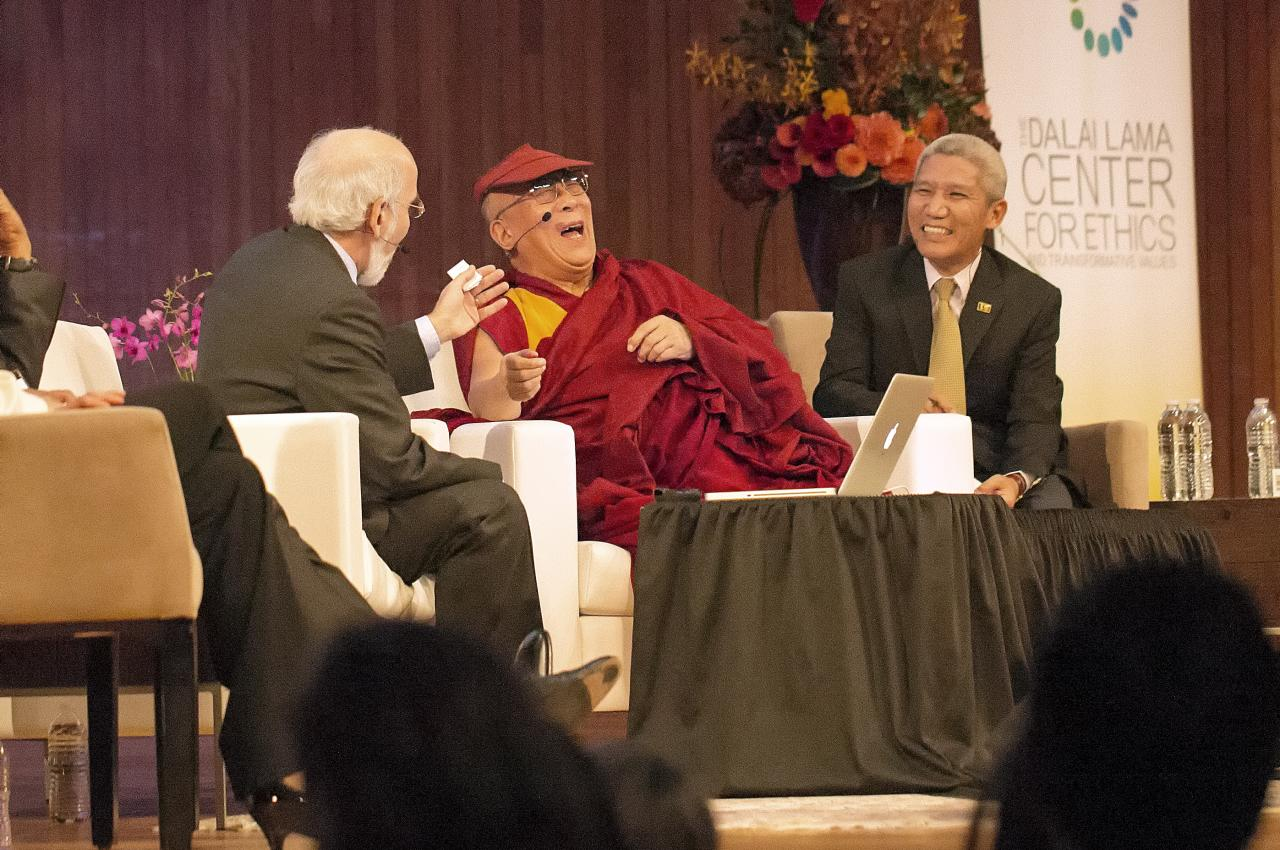
The Dalai Lama and Geshe Thupten Jinpa in Boston in 2012.

Following the publication of the book and the 1994 John Main Seminar at Middlesex University, the Way of Peace Fellowship was established. This group brought together students from Georgetown University and the Catholic University of America in Washington, D.C., with the goal of fostering Christian-Buddhist dialogue and meditation practice.

The fellowship emphasizes practical interfaith engagement, encouraging members to explore contemplative practices from both Buddhist and Christian traditions. Activities include regular meditation sessions, interfaith discussion forums, workshops, and seminars that highlight ethical and spiritual principles common to both religions, while respecting their unique teachings. Participants are encouraged to reflect on the Dalai Lama’s guidance on compassion, service, and ethical living as complementary to Christian practice, thereby deepening their understanding of multiple faith traditions.

The establishment of the Way of Peace Fellowship demonstrates the tangible, ongoing impact of the seminar and the book. By translating the Dalai Lama’s teachings into student-led initiatives, the fellowship has become a model for interreligious dialogue in academic settings. It also exemplifies the practical application of meditation and ethical reflection in everyday life, showing how cross-traditional engagement can foster understanding, mutual respect, and collaboration among young people from diverse cultural and religious backgrounds.

Through its activities, the fellowship continues to inspire similar initiatives internationally, encouraging educational institutions and spiritual organizations to adopt programs that integrate contemplative practices with interfaith dialogue. The group highlights how historical seminars and publications, such as the 1994 John Main, can have enduring influence on the promotion of peace, understanding, and spiritual growth across religious traditions.

== Critical reception ==
The book has been recognized by scholars and reviewers for its contribution to interfaith dialogue and comparative religion studies. According to Raphaël Liogier, as well as Marcus Borg and Ray Riegert, the book is part of a group of widely circulated works that compare Buddhism and Christianity. (Note: There exists on both sides a multitude of widely circulated works that compare Buddhism and Christianity (for example: Thich Nhat Hanh, *Living Buddha, Living Christ*, Paris, Jean-Claude Lattès, 1996; or the Dalai Lama, *The Dalai Lama Speaks of Jesus*, Brussels, Prebols, 1997).)

Reviewers have praised the Dalai Lama’s approach as respectful, highlighting both the common ethical principles shared by Buddhism and Christianity and the differences that preserve each tradition’s integrity. The book’s format, combining lectures with interactive seminar discussions, has been noted as particularly effective in demonstrating practical interfaith engagement.

Scholars such as Jean-Paul Ribes emphasize that the Dalai Lama’s reflections encourage spiritual enrichment and moral reflection without advocating conversion or syncretism, reinforcing the value of religious diversity and dialogue. The text has also been acknowledged for providing a detailed comparative analysis of the eight Gospel passages with Buddhist ethical principles, making it useful for both Buddhist and Christian audiences seeking mutual understanding.

Some reviewers note that the book’s historical and cultural context, including the 1994 John Main Seminar and the involvement of 350 participants from different religious backgrounds, strengthens its credibility as a source of dialogue-oriented scholarship. It has been described as a “landmark text” for interreligious studies, demonstrating that cross-traditional engagement can be meaningful without compromising doctrinal integrity.

The book is considered highly influential in both academic and spiritual circles for fostering understanding, respect, and collaboration between major world religions, particularly Buddhism and Christianity.
