= Martin Palmer =

Martin Giles Palmer (born 14 October 1953) is a theologian, Sinologist, author and international specialist on all major faiths and religious traditions and cultures. He is the Founding President and Chief Executive of FaithInvest, an international not-for-profit membership association for religious groups and faith-based institutional investors, which empowers faith groups to invest in line with their values. FaithInvest grew out of the Alliance of Religions and Conservation (ARC) of which Palmer was Secretary General from 1995 to 2019. Palmer is also the Director of the International Consultancy on Religion, Education and Culture (ICOREC).

== Career ==
Palmer is the author and editor of more than 20 books on religious and environmental topics and the translator of several popular books on Sinology, including Zhuangzi and I Ching. His 2001 book The Jesus Sutras, a translation of the Jingjiao Documents, gives a popular and controversial interpretation of early Chinese Christianity as ‘syncretistic’. In 2018, Palmer's abridged translation of Romance of the Three Kingdoms was published by Penguin Classics.

An Anglican Christian, Palmer attended Commonweal Senior High School in Swindon and studied theology and religious studies at Selwyn College, Cambridge. He is a regular contributor to the BBC on religious, ethical and historical issues. He appears regularly on BBC Radio 3 and 4, BBC World Service and BBC TV as a presenter, and is also a contributor to programmes such as In Our Time, Thought for the Day, Night Waves, Beyond Belief and Songs of Praise. He appeared on the BBC World Service for a week-long China series in October 2007.

In 2009 Palmer was co-chair of a joint ARC-UNDP programme on the faiths, climate change and the environment, which launched a series of major faith commitments on the environment at Windsor Castle in November 2009 followed by a further commitments launched in Nairobi, Kenya. In total, more than 60 faith long-term commitments were developed which have profoundly shaped the faiths' response to key environmental issues. In 2020, FaithInvest began a programme, Faith Plans, building on the 2009 commitments, asking the faiths to consider how they will manage their assets, investments, influence and resources to drive practical action on climate change, biodiversity and sustainable development over the next seven to ten years.

== Reception ==
Speaking of Palmer's work The Jesus Sutras, historian David Wilmshurst criticised the work as a "...New age fantasy..." and stated that Palmer's reading of Tang era Nestorian texts and his claim of syncretism of Nestorianism with Eastern religions is inaccurate and misleading. Wilmshurst also states that "As the Sian [Xi'an] Tablet inscription demonstrates, they [the Nestorians in China] were orthodox Christians who pointedly distinguished themselves from both the Taoists and the Buddhists." Wilmshurst described Palmer's book as being part of a long conflict between what he termed romantic (making overzealous interpretations) and realist (making more sober interpretations) researchers who have studied Chinese Nestorianism since the discovery of the Xi'an Stele in 1625.

James Morris of the University of St. Andrews wrote that while "Palmer has done wonders in popularizing the subject matter [of medieval Christianity in China] and that his "assertion that Taoism had an effect on Táng-period Christian texts is no doubt useful" he has also criticised Palmer for having "an uncanny ability to draw upon early 20th-century scholarship as if it were factual." Morris also stated that Palmer's conclusion that the Daqin Pagoda was of Christian origin is inconclusive and premature until more research is conducted.

== Selected publications ==
- Palmer, Martin (2012), Sacred Land: Decoding Britain's extraordinary past through its towns, villages and countryside, Hachette UK
- Breuilly, Elizabeth; O'Brien, Joanne; Palmer, Martin; Marty, Martin E (2005), Religions of the world : the illustrated guide to origins, beliefs, traditions & festivals, Checkmark Books/Facts On File, ISBN 9780816062584
- Palmer, Martin; Finlay, Victoria (2003), Faith in conservation : new approaches to religions and the environment, Directions in development (Washington, D.C.), World Bank, ISBN 9780821355596
- Palmer, Martin (2001), The Jesus Sutras: Rediscovering the Lost Religion of Taoist Christianity, Piatkus, ISBN 978-0-7499-2250-4
- Breuilly, Elizabeth; Palmer, Martin (1993), Sainsbury's religions of the world, Harper Collins, OCLC 40662616
- Breuilly, Elizabeth; Palmer, Martin (1992), Christianity and ecology, World religions and ecology., Cassell, ISBN 9780304323746
- Palmer, Martin (1992), Dancing to Armageddon, Aquarian/Thorsons, ISBN 1855381850
