= Alliance of Religions and Conservation =

UKbased non-governmental organisation

- Abbreviation: ARC
- Formation: 1995
- Type: NGO
- Headquarters: ARC; The House, Kelston Park; Bath BA1 9AE; United Kingdom
- Region served: Worldwide
- Official language: English
- Website: www.arcworld.org

The Alliance of Religions and Conservation (ARC) was a United Kingdom-based international organisation founded by Prince Philip, in 1995.

ARC was a secular body whose aim was to assist the major religions of the world to develop environmental programmes based on their own core teachings, beliefs and practices. In 2007 it joined with the United Nations Development Programme (UNDP) to develop a significant and innovative programme to work with the world’s major faiths to address issues of global warming and the natural environment through the development of faith-based “Long Term Commitments for a Living Planet” – pledges of faith action on the environment aimed at achieving generational change.

Many of the religions working with ARC presented their Long-Term Commitments at the ARC-UNDP conference in Windsor Castle in November 2009, at which Secretary-General of the United Nations Ban Ki-moon and Prince Philip were present. More than 30 commitments were made in total.

At the time UNDP Assistant Secretary-General Olav Kjørven described this coming together of religion and conservation as: “potentially the biggest civil society movement on climate change in history” and “the biggest mobilisation of people and communities that we have ever seen on this issue”.

In September 2012, as a result of support and co-ordination by ARC, 27 faith groups from sub-Saharan Africa presented their Long-Term Commitments for a Living Planet at an ARC-organised meeting in Nairobi, Kenya.

Martin Palmer was the Secretary General of the Alliance of Religions and Conservation.

ARC announced its closure in June 2019.

== See also ==
- Muslim Seven Year Action Plan on Climate Change
- Religion and environmentalism
