= Zhouzhi County =

Zhouzhi County 周至县 Chowchih
- County
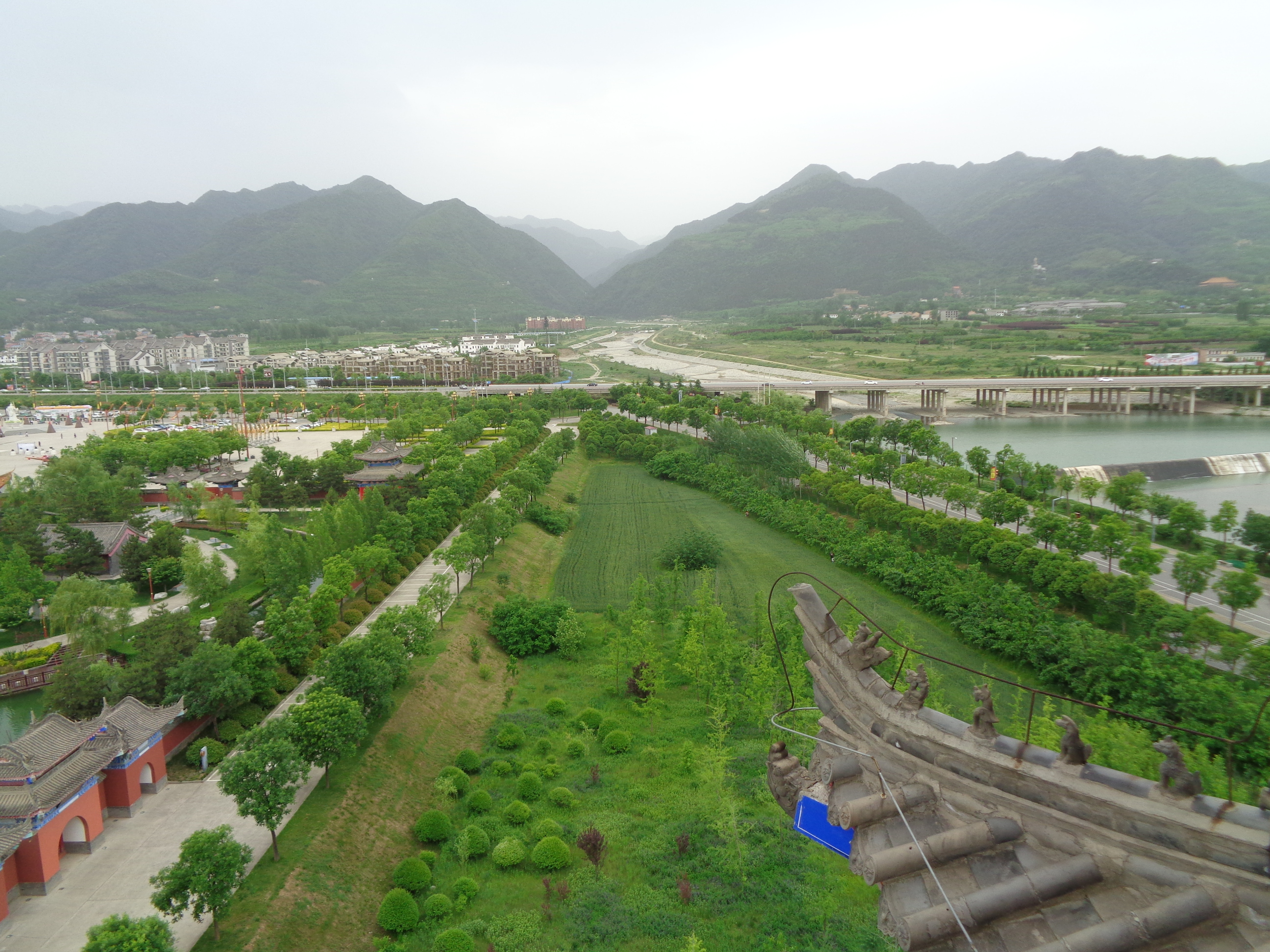
- Louguantai temple (楼观台）

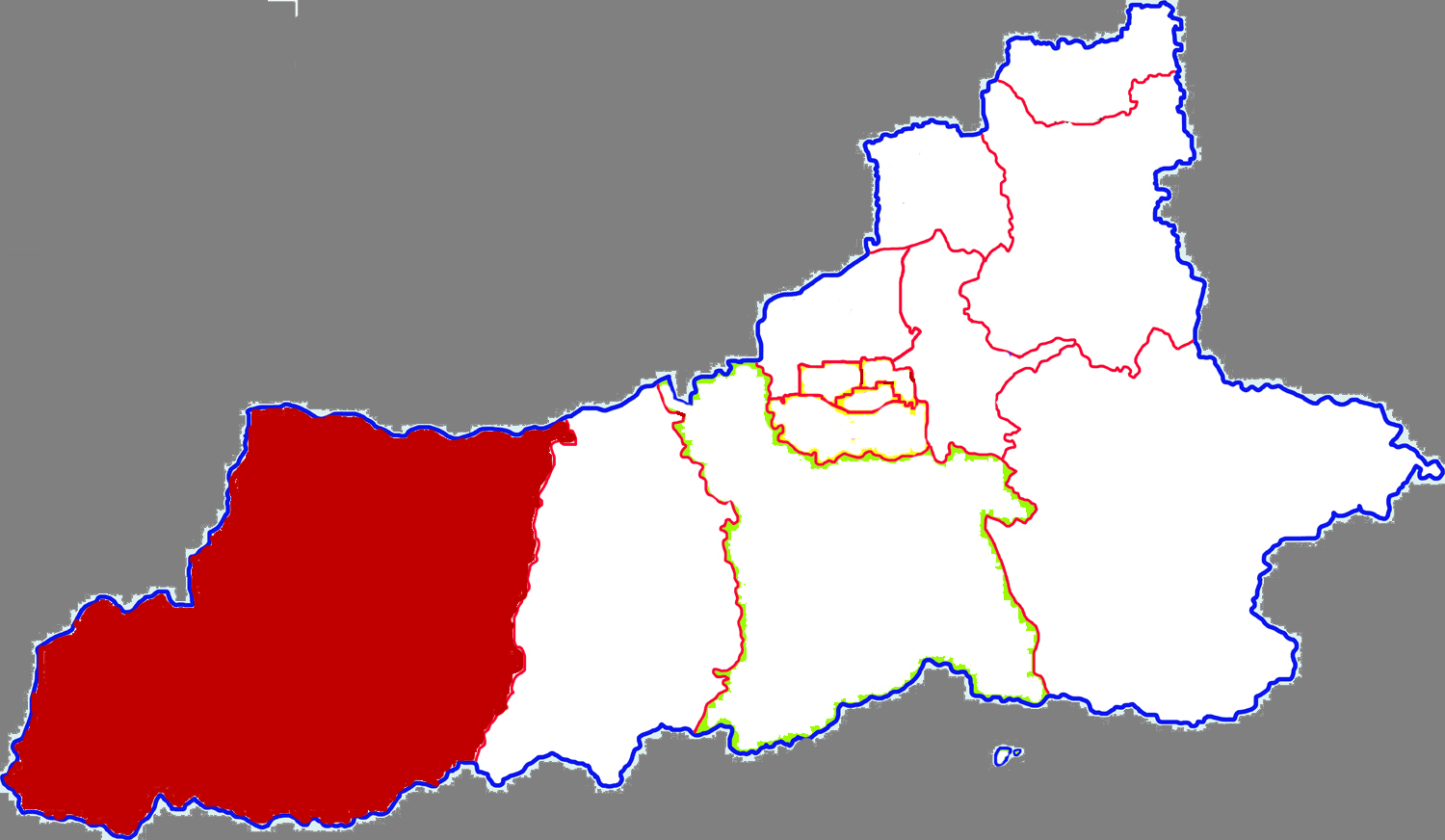
- Location of the county in Xi'an
- Coordinates: 34°09′29″N 108°12′50″E
- Country: China
- Province: Shaanxi
- Prefecture-level city: Xi'an

Area
  - Total: 2,974 km^{2} (1,148 sq mi)

Population (2019)
  - Total: 672,605
  - Density: 191.08/km^{2} (494.9/sq mi)
- Time zone: UTC+8 (China Standard)
- Postal code: 710400

Zhouzhi County (simplified Chinese: 周至县; traditional Chinese: 周至縣; pinyin: Zhōuzhì Xiàn) is a county under the administration of Xi'an, the capital of Shaanxi province, China. It is the most spacious but least densely populated county-level division of Xi'an, and also contains the city's southernmost and westernmost points. Since the establishment of Huyi District in 2016, replacing the former Hu County, Zhouzhi and Lantian are the only two counties under the administration of Xi'an. Zhouzhi borders the prefecture-level cities of Xianyang to the north, Ankang to the southeast, Hanzhong to the southwest, and Baoji to the west, as well as Xi'an's Huyi District to the east. It is famous for kiwifruit, one type of produce in which Shaanxi province excels. Many of notable historical figures have visited Zhouzhi county, such as Chinese philosopher Laozi (老子), poet Bai Juyi (白居易), and British biochemist Joseph Needham.

There are some claims Yu the Great (大禹) was born in Hongqi village, Zhouzhi County.

In 1964, the Chinese writing of Zhouzhi was changed from '盩厔' to its current homophonous writing '周至' as part of the Chinese toponym writing reforms.

== Administrative divisions ==
As of 2020, Zhouzhi County is divided to 1 subdistrict and 19 towns.

Subdistricts

- Erqu Subdistrict (二曲街道)

Towns

- Yabai (哑柏镇)
- Zhongnan (终南镇)
- Mazhao (马召镇)
- Jixian (集贤镇)
- Louguan (楼观镇)
- Shangcun (尚村镇)
- Guangji (广济镇)
- Houzhenzi (厚畛子镇)
- Qinghua (青化镇)
- Zhuyu (竹峪镇)
- Cuifeng (翠峰镇)
- Situn (四屯镇)
- Sizhu (司竹镇)
- Jiufeng (九峰镇)
- Furen (富仁镇)
- Luoyu (骆峪镇)
- Chenhe (陈河镇)
- Banfangzi (板房子镇)
- Wangjiahe (王家河镇)

== Climate ==
Climate data for Zhouzhi, elevation 436 m (1,430 ft), (1991–2020 normals, extremes 1991–present)
Month	Jan	Feb	Mar	Apr	May	Jun	Jul	Aug	Sep	Oct	Nov	Dec	Year
Record high °C (°F)	17.8 (64.0)	24.8 (76.6)	30.3 (86.5)	36.4 (97.5)	38.2 (100.8)	41.5 (106.7)	40.7 (105.3)	41.1 (106.0)	38.2 (100.8)	32.5 (90.5)	26.1 (79.0)	18.6 (65.5)	41.5 (106.7)
Mean daily maximum °C (°F)	5.4 (41.7)	9.6 (49.3)	15.6 (60.1)	22.2 (72.0)	26.9 (80.4)	31.3 (88.3)	32.4 (90.3)	30.2 (86.4)	25.0 (77.0)	19.3 (66.7)	12.9 (55.2)	6.9 (44.4)	19.8 (67.7)
Daily mean °C (°F)	0.4 (32.7)	4.2 (39.6)	9.7 (49.5)	15.8 (60.4)	20.5 (68.9)	25.1 (77.2)	27.0 (80.6)	25.1 (77.2)	20.0 (68.0)	14.1 (57.4)	7.6 (45.7)	1.9 (35.4)	14.3 (57.7)
Mean daily minimum °C (°F)	−3.0 (26.6)	0.3 (32.5)	5.3 (41.5)	10.7 (51.3)	15.3 (59.5)	19.9 (67.8)	22.5 (72.5)	21.2 (70.2)	16.6 (61.9)	10.7 (51.3)	3.9 (39.0)	−1.6 (29.1)	10.2 (50.3)
Record low °C (°F)	−13.7 (7.3)	−9.5 (14.9)	−5.6 (21.9)	0.2 (32.4)	5.9 (42.6)	11.2 (52.2)	14.8 (58.6)	13.9 (57.0)	8.6 (47.5)	1.1 (34.0)	−7.1 (19.2)	−14.3 (6.3)	−14.3 (6.3)
Average precipitation mm (inches)	6.7 (0.26)	11.2 (0.44)	27.9 (1.10)	41.4 (1.63)	63.7 (2.51)	81.1 (3.19)	87.9 (3.46)	106.5 (4.19)	117.8 (4.64)	60.5 (2.38)	20.6 (0.81)	5.2 (0.20)	630.5 (24.81)
Average precipitation days (≥ 0.1 mm)	3.7	4.3	7.0	7.2	9.9	8.6	9.5	10.4	12.0	10.7	6.0	3.4	92.7
Average snowy days	4.4	3.1	1.3	0.1	0	0	0	0	0	0	1.0	2.7	12.6
Average relative humidity (%)	64	63	62	64	64	63	70	77	80	79	74	67	69
Mean monthly sunshine hours	118.3	115.7	149.8	175.9	195.0	191.2	194.2	159.9	118.6	117.8	124.3	120.3	1,781
Percentage possible sunshine	37	37	40	45	45	44	45	39	32	34	40	39	40
Source: China Meteorological Administration

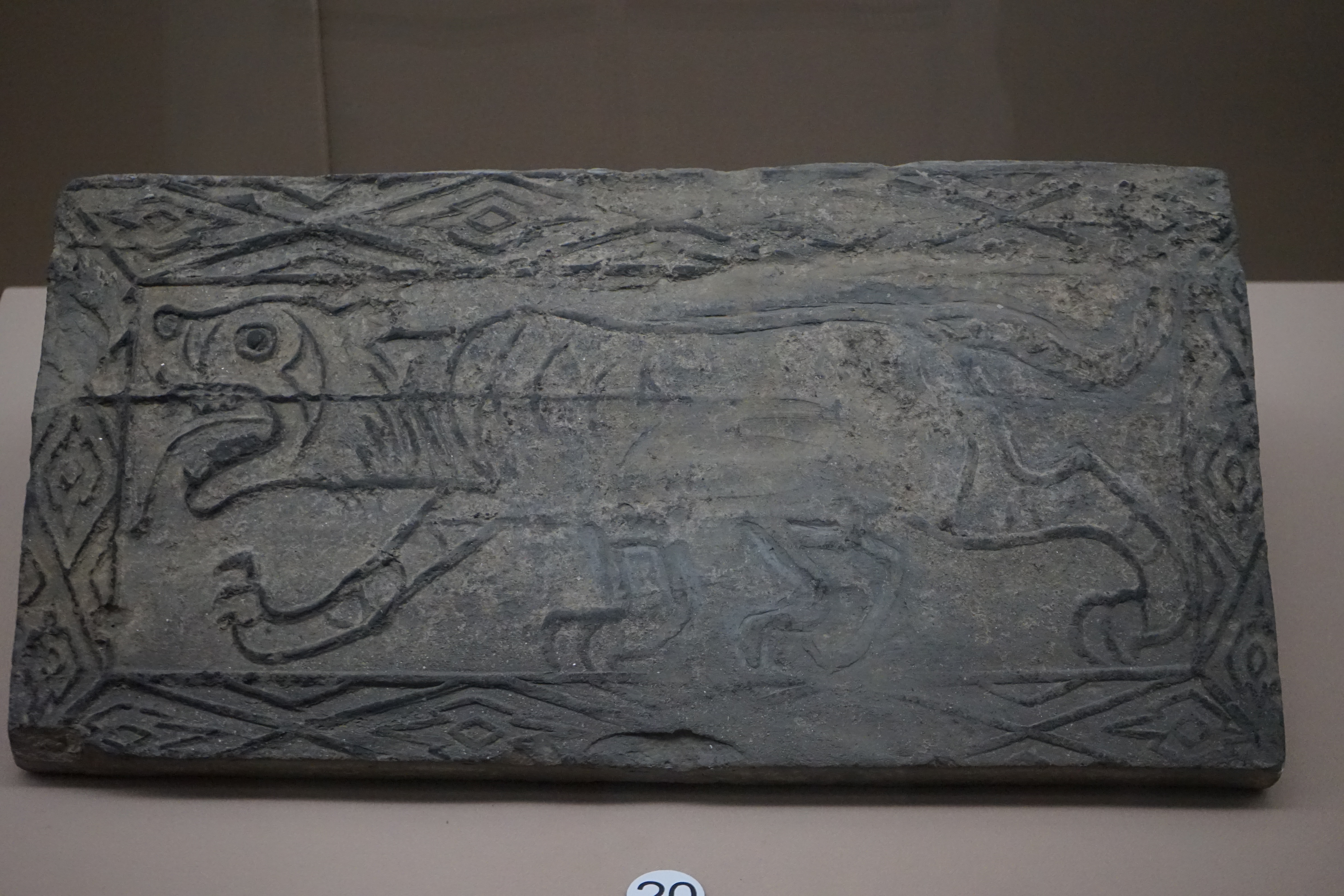
Tiger-Patterned Brick, Zhouzhi County Museum

== See also ==
- Roman Catholic Diocese of Zhouzhi
- Louguantai
- Daqin Pagoda
