= Daqin Pagoda =

Buddhist pagoda in Zhouzhi County of Xi'an in China

Coordinates: 34°03′32″N 108°18′27″E

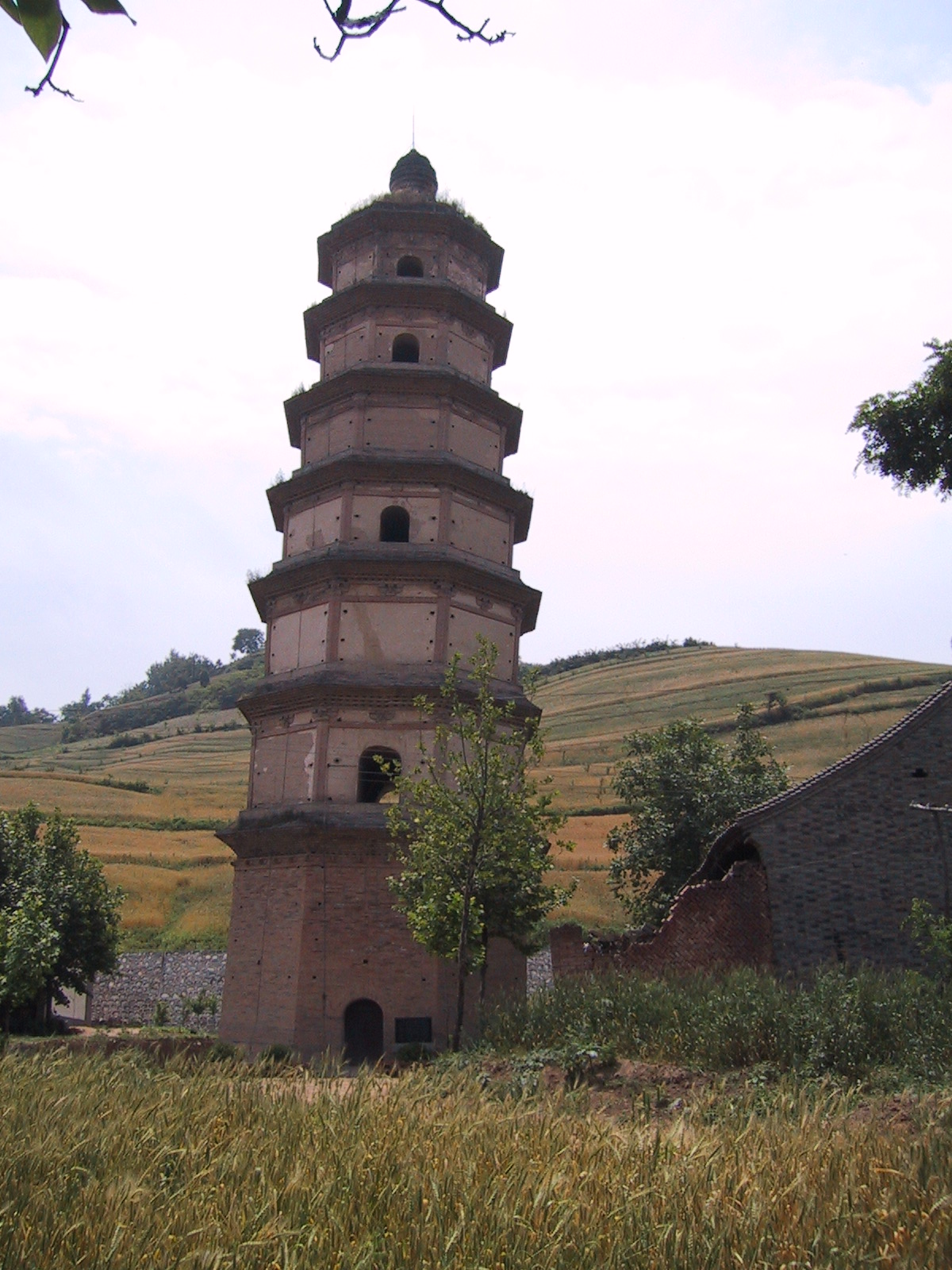
Remnants of the pagoda

The Daqin Pagoda (Chinese: 大秦塔) is a Buddhist pagoda in Zhouzhi County of Xi'an (formerly Chang'an), Shaanxi Province, China, located about two kilometres to the west of Louguantai temple. The pagoda has been claimed by some writers and religious figures as a Jingjiao church from the Tang dynasty but there has been no conclusive evidence of such a connection.

== Etymology ==
Daqin is the ancient Chinese name for the Roman Empire or, depending on context, the Near East, especially Syria.

== History ==
The Daqin Pagoda is first attested in 1065, when the Chinese poet Su Dongpo visited it and wrote a well-known poem about it, "Daqin Temple". His younger brother Su Zhe also wrote an "echoing" poem referring to the monks at the temple. An earthquake severely damaged the pagoda in 1556 and it was finally abandoned. Due to the earthquake, many of the underground chambers of the complex are no longer reachable.

== Features ==
The seven-storeyed octagonal brick pagoda is about 34 meters high (was thought to be 32 in the past). Each side of the first storey measures 4.3 meters.

== Speculation about Christianity ==
The Daqin Pagoda was visited by Assyrian Church of the East bishop Mar Awa Royel in 2012 as part of a follow-up visit to China in 2010, upon invitation from the Jingjiao Fellowship and director Mr. David Tam.

In 2001 the pagoda was claimed by Martin Palmer, the translator of several popular books on sinology, including Zhuangzi and I Ching, as a form of Christianity from the Tang dynasty, in his controversial book The Jesus Sutras. According to Palmer, the church and the monastery were built in 640 by early Church of the East missionaries. Daqin is the name for the Roman Empire in the early Chinese-language documents of the 1st and 2nd centuries; by the mid-9th century it was also used to refer to the mission churches of the Syriac Christians.

Supporters of Palmer's claims have drawn attention to details which suggest that the monastery was earlier a Christian church, including a supposed depiction of Jonah at the walls of Nineveh, a nativity scene (depiction of the birth of Jesus) and Syriac graffiti. The east-facing orientation of the complex is also advanced as evidence of its Christian origin since Chinese Daoist and Buddhist temple complexes face north or south.

As a potential stimulus to the district's tourist trade, Palmer's claims have been given wide publicity by the local authorities but have also received approbation by Chinese academics. The exterior of the pagoda and its surroundings were featured in the first episode of the 2009 BBC program A History of Christianity. The program also featured an interview with Palmer by the presenter Professor Diarmaid MacCulloch.

Despite the publicity they have received, Palmer's claims are controversial, and have been dismissed by Michael Keevak, the author of The Story of a Stele, and by David Wilmshurst, the author of The Martyred Church: A History of the Church of the East.

James Morris of the University of St. Andrews has stated of the pagoda that "until more detailed archaeological analysis of the site is undertaken [...] we must be content in maintaining that there are no proven direct archaeological remains for the presence of Christianity during the Táng period."

== See also ==
- Xi'an Stele
- Jingjiao Documents
- Cross Temple – temple in Beijing used during different periods by Buddhists and East Syriac Christians
- Pearl Temple – a Tang-dynasty East Syriac church in Chengdu built no later than 756 AD
