= Muslim Seven Year Action Plan on Climate Change =

Climate action plan

The Muslim Seven Year Action Plan on Climate Change was a proposed climate action plan for the global Islamic community, meant to run from 2010 to 2017. It was developed by the British Earth Mates Dialogue Center and the Kuwait Ministry of Awqaf and Islamic Affairs. It is one of several multi-year climate action plans developed by major religious communities, developed in coordination with the Alliance of Religions and Conservation and the United Nations Development Programme.

According to the Alliance of Religions and Conservation, the plan proposes "investigating every level of Muslim activity from daily life to annual pilgrimages, from holy cities to the future training of Imams," "developing the major Muslim cities as green city models for other Islamic urban areas," and "developing an Islamic label for environmentally friendly goods and services." Proposals were to be managed by a group called the Muslim Association for Climate Change Action (MACCA, an acronym meant to sound like "Mecca").

== 2009 Istanbul conference ==
At a follow-up conference in Istanbul in July 2009, about two hundred Muslim scholars, leaders, and government officials endorsed the plan and established MACCA. Endorsers included the Grand Mufti of Egypt, Sheikh Ali Goma'a, the Mufti of Palestine, Dr. Ekrama Sabri, the Adviser of the Prince of Mecca and Medina, and the Islamic Educational, Scientific and Cultural Organisation.

== 2009 Windsor launch ==
The plan was launched at the Windsor Celebration in November 2009.

== 2010 Climate Change Meeting, Bogor ==
According to Islam Today, the April 2010 International Muslim Conference on Climate Change Issues in Bogor, Indonesia included discussion of a wide range of policy ideas, but failed to set up the proposed Muslim Association on Climate Change Action (MACCA) as an umbrella group to implement the Bogor declaration."
