= Jiufeng, Shaanxi =

Jiufeng 九峰镇
- Town
- Location in China
- Coordinates: 34°4′55″N 108°25′30″E
- Country: People's Republic of China
- Province: Shaanxi
- Prefecture-level city: Xi'an
- County: Zhouzhi County
- Time zone: UTC+8 (China Standard)

Jiufeng (Chinese: 九峰; pinyin: Jiǔfēng) is a town under the administration of Zhouzhi County, Shaanxi, China.

As of 2023, it administers the following fourteen villages:

- Hejiazhai Village (何家寨村)
- Qiliang Village (起良村)
- Lianxin Village (联新村)
- Xuejiapu Village (薛家堡村)
- Erlian Village (二联村)
- Shayun Village (沙云村)
- Weijiazhuang Village (魏家庄村)
- Ganwu Village (甘午村)
- Xingfeng Village (星峰村)
- Beiqianhu Village (北千户村)
- Nanqianhu Village (南千户村)
- Yujia Village (余家村)
- Hufeng Village (虎峰村)
- Gengxi Village (耿西村)

== See also ==
- List of township-level divisions of Shaanxi
