= Jiufeng Subdistrict, Pu'an County =

Jiufeng Subdistrict 九峰街道
- Subdistrict
- Location in Guizhou
- Coordinates: 25°45′11″N 104°54′36″E
- Country: People's Republic of China
- Province: Guizhou
- Autonomous prefecture: Qianxinan Buyei and Miao Autonomous Prefecture
- County: Pu'an County
- Time zone: UTC+8 (China Standard)

Jiufeng Subdistrict (Chinese: 九峰街道; pinyin: Jiǔfēng Jiēdào) is a subdistrict in Pu'an County, Guizhou, China. As of 2023, it administers Jiufeng Village, Yunzhuang Village (云庄村), Baochong Village (保冲村) and three residential communities: Banqiao Community (板桥社区), Longxi Community (龙溪社区), and Yong'an Community (甬安社区).

== See also ==
- List of township-level divisions of Guizhou
