= Jiufeng Subdistrict, Wuhan =

Jiufeng Subdistrict 九峰街道
- Subdistrict
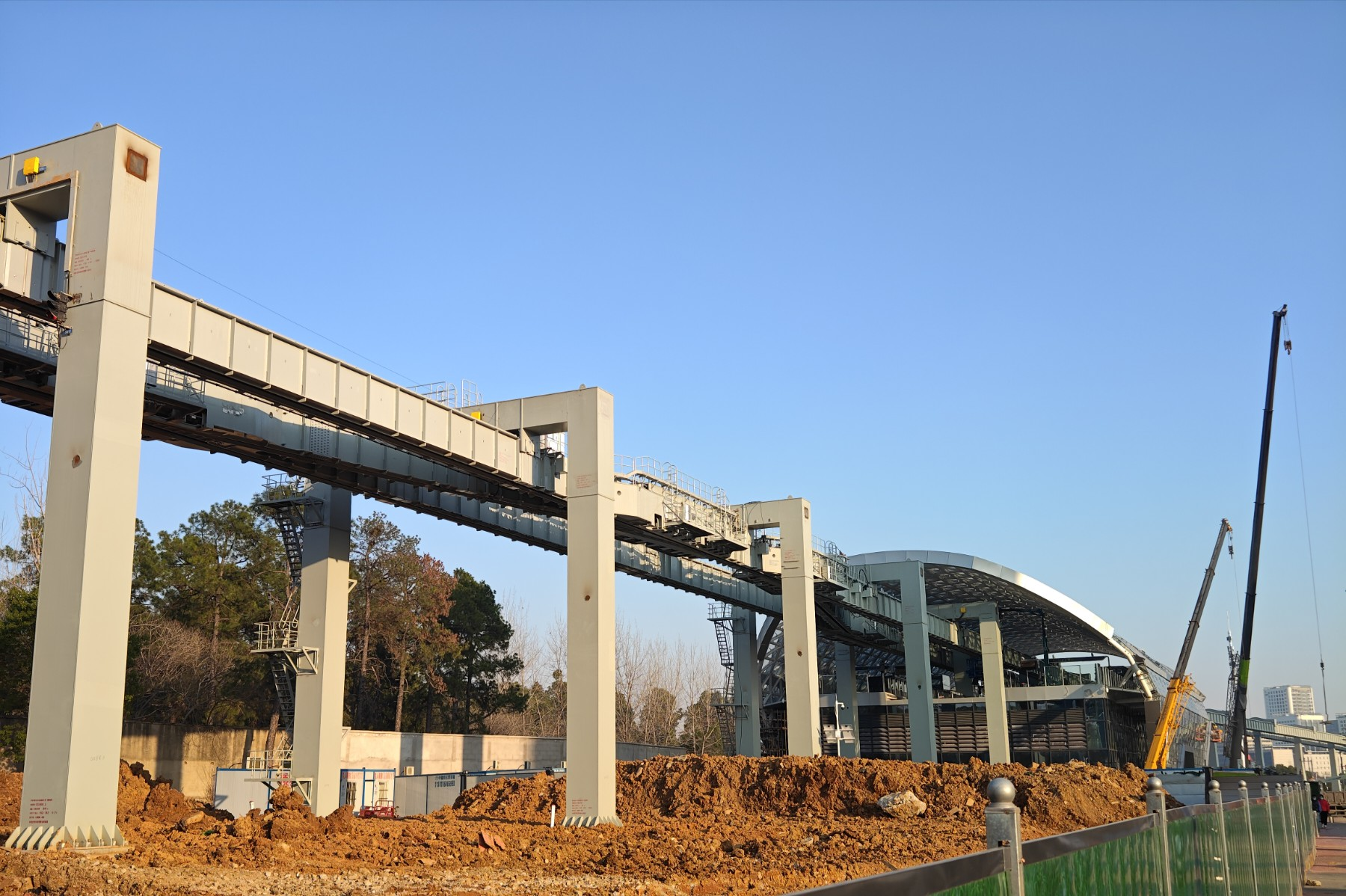
- Mount Jiufeng station of Wuhan Monorail, under construction (2023)

- Location in Hubei
- Coordinates: 30°30′30″N 114°28′33″E
- Country: People's Republic of China
- Province: Hubei
- Prefecture-level city: Wuhan
- District: Hongshan District
- Time zone: UTC+8 (China Standard)

Jiufeng Subdistrict (Chinese: 九峰街道; pinyin: Jiǔfēng Jiēdào) is a subdistrict in Hongshan District, Wuhan, Hubei, China. As of 2023, it administers ten villages and ten residential communities:

- Jiufeng Village
- Sanxing Village (三星村)
- Qunjian Village (群建村)
- Xinhong Village (新洪村)
- Xinnong Village (新农村)
- Xinjian Village (新建村)
- Mayi Village (马驿村)
- Baofeng Village (保丰村)
- Xinyue Village (新跃村)
- Heliu Village (何刘村)
- Wangdian Community (王店社区)
- Jingyuanli Community (景源里社区)
- Dexinli Community (德欣里社区)
- Mingchangli Community (明畅里社区)
- Qingheli Community (清和里社区)
- Tong'anli Community (同安里社区)
- Renshangli Community (仁尚里社区)
- Huachengli Community (华诚里社区)
- Rongfangli Community (荣芳里社区)
- Xingguangli Community (星光里社区)

== See also ==
- List of township-level divisions of Hubei
