= Jiufeng, Guangdong =

Jiufeng 九峰镇
- Town
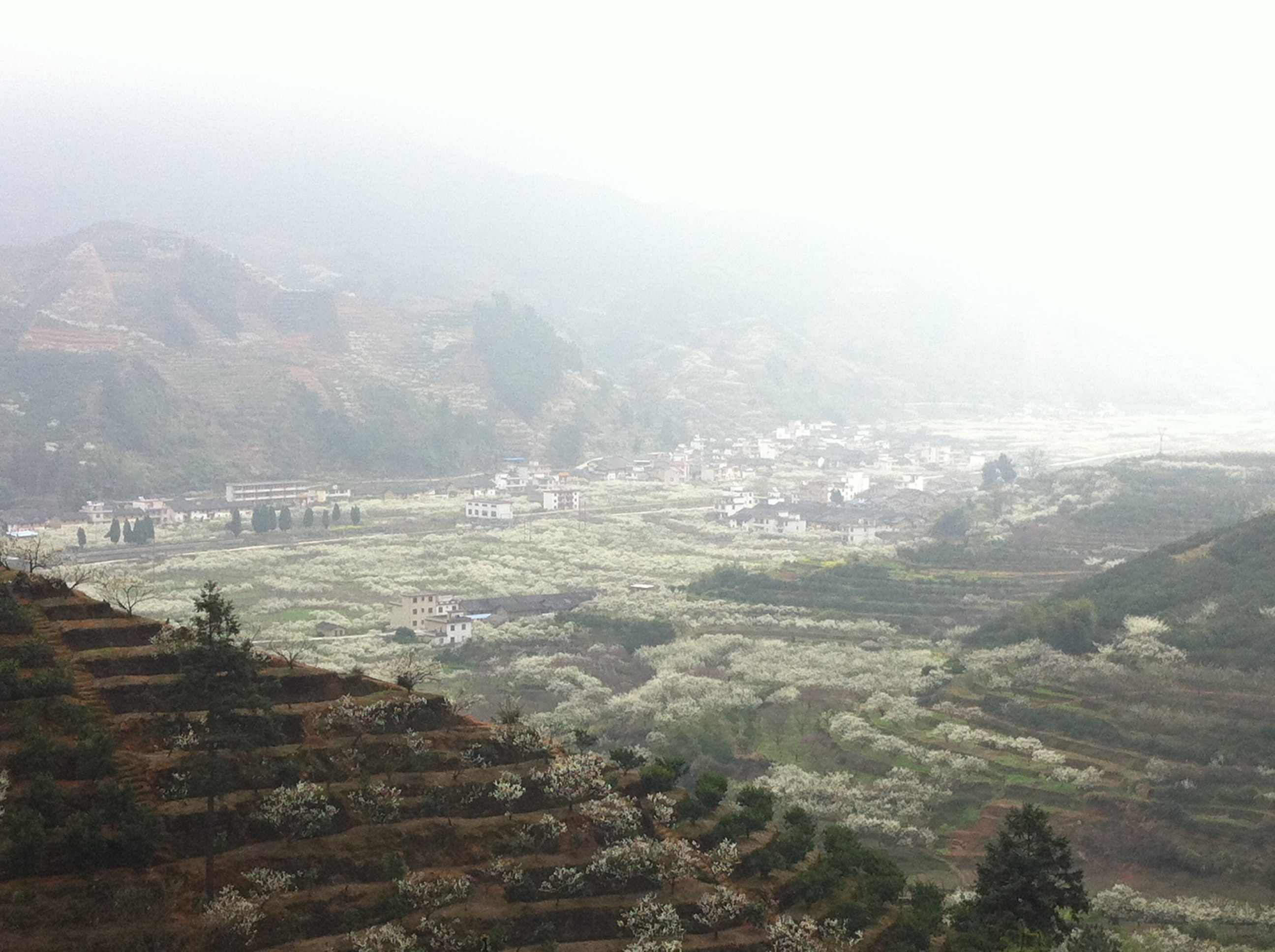
- Chaliao Village in 2012

- Location in Guangdong
- Coordinates: 25°20′40″N 113°22′20″E
- Country: People's Republic of China
- Province: Guangdong
- Prefecture-level city: Shaoguan
- County-level city: Lechang
- Time zone: UTC+8 (China Standard)

Jiufeng (Chinese: 九峰; pinyin: Jiǔfēng) is a town under the administration of Lechang, Guangdong, China. As of 2023, it administers Jiufengjie Residential Community (九峰街社区) and the following twelve villages:

- Jiangyuan Village (浆源村)
- Wendong Village (文洞村)
- Chaliao Village (茶料村)
- Lian'an Village (联安村)
- Pingshi Village (坪石村)
- Sanlian Village (三联村)
- Hengkeng Village (横坑村)
- Shanglang Village (上廊村)
- Xiaolang Village (小廊村)
- Dalang Village (大廊村)
- Huangdong Village (遑洞村)
- Xixia Village (溪下村)
