= Nestorian pillar of Luoyang =

Tang Chinese stele erected in 781

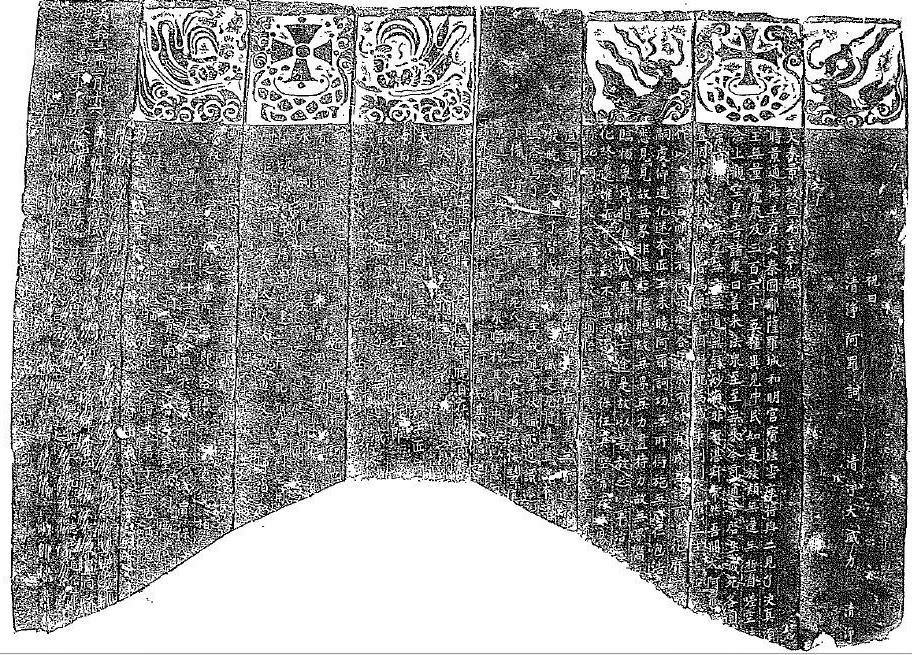
- Rubbing of the Nestorian pillar entitled "大秦景教宣元至本經", which was erected in China in 814-815.
- Traditional Chinese: 大秦景教宣元至本經經幢
- Simplified Chinese: 大秦景教宣元至本经经幢
- Literal meaning: Pillar of the Sutra on the Origin of Origins of Daqin Luminous Religion
Transcriptions
Standard Mandarin
- Hanyu Pinyin: Dàqín Jǐngjiào Xuānyuán Zhìběnjīng Jīngchuáng

The Nestorian pillar of Luoyang (Note: Chinese: 大秦景教宣元至本經; pinyin: Dàqín jǐng jiàoxuān yuán zhì běn jīng; trans. "Sutra on the Origin of Origins of Daqin Luminous Religion") is a Tang Chinese pillar erected in 814–815 CE, which contains inscriptions related to early Christianity in China, particularly the Church of the East. It is a Nestorian pillar, discovered in 2006 in Luoyang, which is related to the Xi'an Stele.

== The pillar ==
The title of the pillar is 大秦景教宣元至本經, which translates to "Sutra on the Origin of Origins of Daqin Luminous Religion", one of the Jingjiao Documents. The pillar was erected in 814-815 CE, and moved to another location in 829 CE, as explained in one part of the inscriptions. The "sutra" which starts with a Trisagion (Qadishā Alāhā) was dedicated to a deceased Lady An (安氏太夫人) of Sogdian descent. The inscription tells about her ancestors who came from Bukhara in Central Asia; her relatives and clergymen from the Luoyang Daqin Monastery, who attended the funeral service also had typical Sogdian surnames such as Mi (米, origin of Maymurgh) and Kang (康, of Samarkand, or historically Kangju).

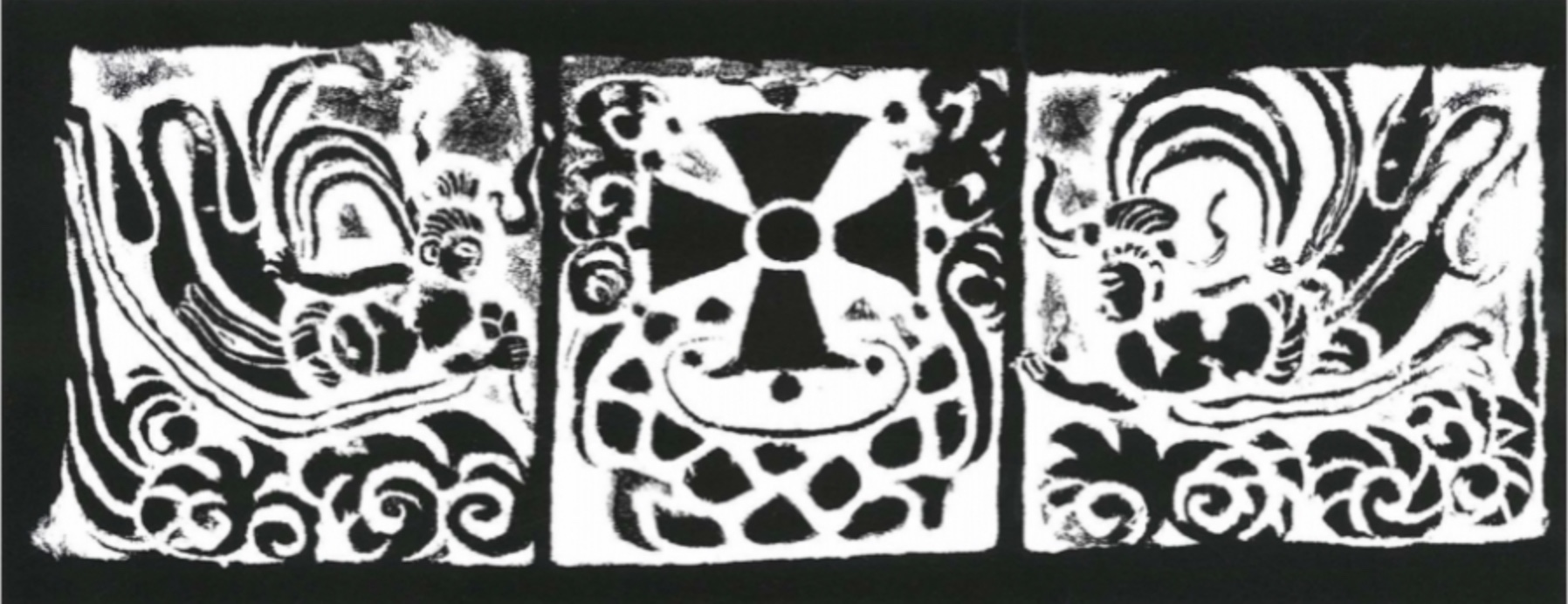
Detail of the rubbing of the pillar, showing a cross on a lotus flower flanked by angels (depicted in the form of apsaras)

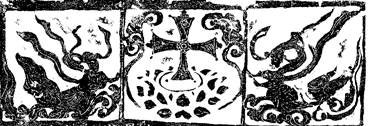
Detail of the rubbing of the pillar, showing a cross on a lotus flower flanked by angels (depicted in the form of apsaras)

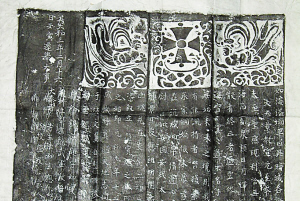
Detail of the rubbing of the pillar

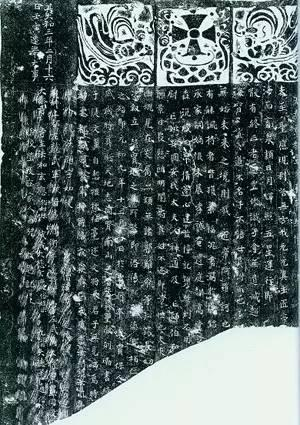
Detail of the rubbing of the pillar

== See also ==
- Church of the East in China
- Jingjiao Documents
- Adam (Jingjing)
- Mogao Christian painting
- Murals from the Christian temple at Qocho
- Sogdian Daēnās
