= Jiufeng, Fujian =

Jiufeng 九峰镇
- Town
- Location in Fujian Jiufeng (China)
- Coordinates: 24°15′12″N 117°0′59″E
- Country: People's Republic of China
- Province: Fujian
- Prefecture-level city: Zhangzhou
- County: Pinghe County
- Time zone: UTC+8 (China Standard)

Jiufeng (Chinese: 九峰; pinyin: Jiǔfēng) is a town under the administration of Pinghe County, Fujian, China. As of 2023, it administers two residential communities—Dongjie (东街; "East Street") and Xijie (西街; "West Street")—and the following 25 villages:

- Jiufeng Village
- Chengdong Village (城东村)
- Chengxi Village (城西村)
- Chengzhong Village (城中村)
- Sankeng Village (三坑村)
- Suyang Village (苏洋村)
- Fuxing Village (复兴村)
- Meishan Village (眉山村)
- Fukeng Village (福坑村)
- Jilei Village (积垒村)
- Xiaping Village (下坪村)
- Chencai Village (陈彩村)
- Huangtian Village (黄田村)
- Chengxi Village (澄溪村)
- Lianfeng Village (联峰村)
- Futian Village (福田村)
- Pingdeng Village (平等村)
- Junxi Village (军溪村)
- Fushan Village (福山村)
- Xinshan Village (新山村)
- Dongfu Village (东富村)
- Zhenyang Village (振阳村)
- Xiabei Village (下北村)
- Xiaxi Village (下西村)
- Shangcang Village (上仓村)
