= Jingjiao Documents =

7th and 8th century Chinese Christian documents

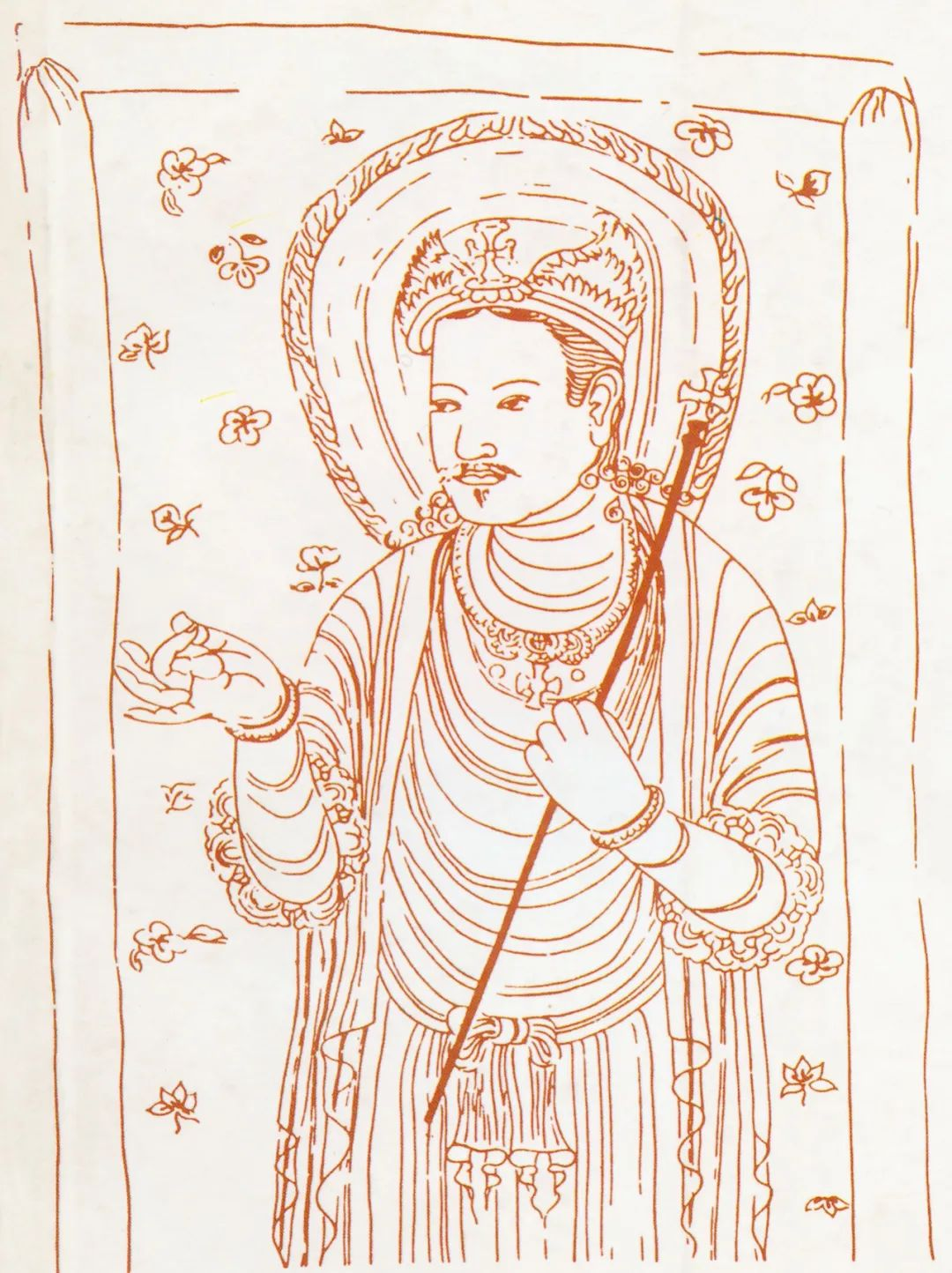
Restored Mogao Christian painting, possibly a representation of Jesus Christ. The original work dates back to the 9th century.

The Jingjiao Documents (Chinese: 景教經典; pinyin: Jǐngjiào jīngdiǎn; also known as the Nestorian Documents or the Jesus Sutras) are a collection of Chinese language texts connected with the 7th-century mission of Alopen, a Church of the East bishop from Sassanian Mesopotamia, and the 8th-century monk Adam. The manuscripts date from between 635, the year of Alopen's arrival in China, and around 1000, when the cave at Mogao near Dunhuang in which the documents were discovered was sealed.

By 2011, four of the manuscripts were known to be in a private collection in Japan, while one was in Paris. Their language and content reflect varying levels of interaction with Chinese culture, including use of Buddhist and Taoist terminology.

== Terminology ==
There is no agreed upon name for the collection of texts as a whole. The Japanese scholar P. Y. Saeki described them as the "Nestorian Documents," which has continued to be used. More recent scholars have moved away from the language of "Nestorian" and simply use the Chinese term, describing them as "Jingjiao Documents."

Sinologist Martin Palmer has attempted to describe these collectively as sutras to connect the documents to Buddhism, given their tendency to use Buddhist terminology. But this is partly related to the names of a subset of the Jingjiao texts which bear the character jing (經). While it is often used to translate into Chinese the Buddhist idea of a sutra, Palmer explains that the character actually means "sacred literature." The character is also used to speak about "classical texts," such as the Confucian Four Books and Five Classics (四書五經), and in the modern rendering for the Bible, Shengjing (聖經). Many of the Jingjiao texts do not use jing but lun (論), which carries a different meaning of "discourse" or "treatise."

== List of texts ==
The following list gives some approximate English titles for the various writings and an indication of the present location of the manuscript where known. Scholars are still debating the best translation for many of the terms.

=== Doctrinal texts ===
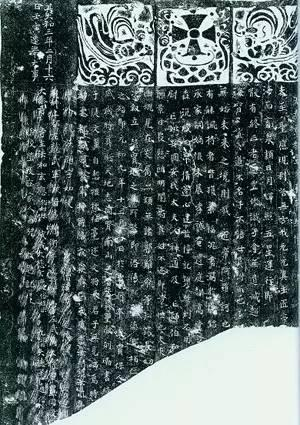
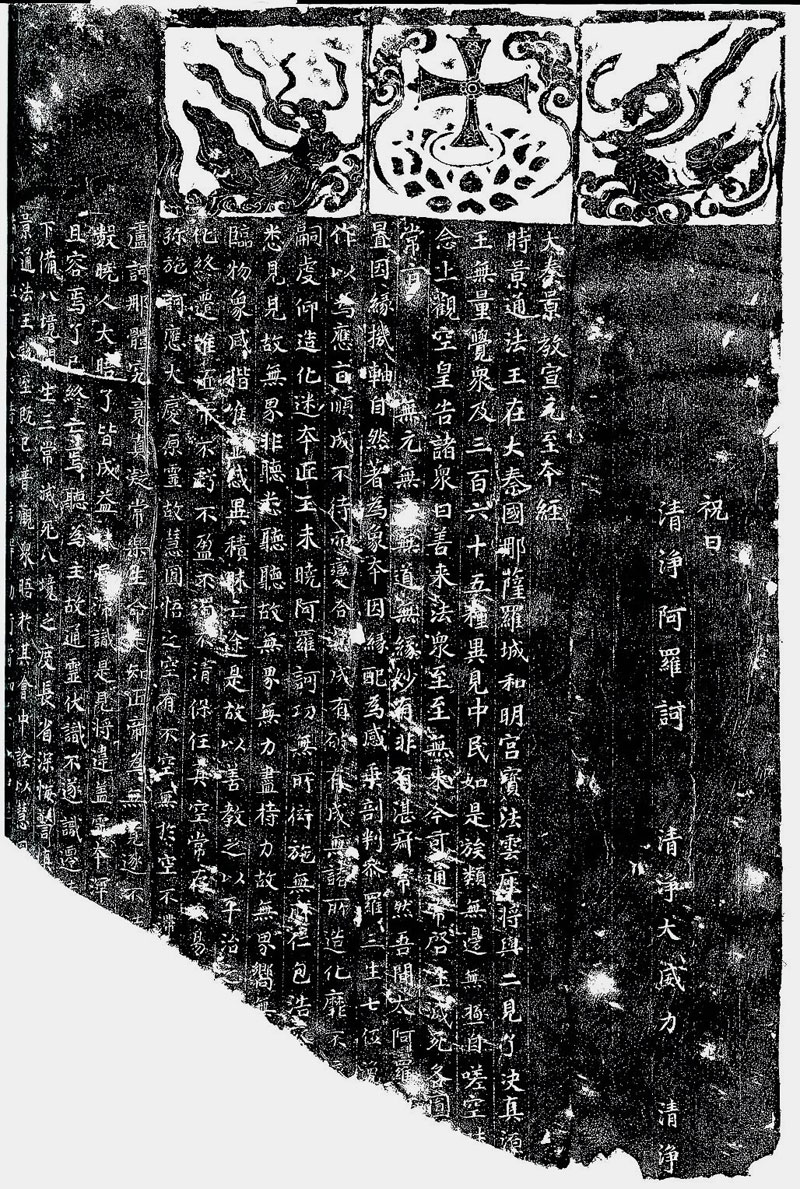
Rubbings of a Tang dynasty scriptural pillar, the Nestorian pillar of Luoyang, the inscription of which bears the Sutra on the Origin of Origins.
1. Discourse on the One God, Part Three (一神論巻第三; Yī shén lùn juǎn dì sān), once known as the Tomioka manuscript; now held in Osaka, Japan, by Kyōu Shooku library, Tonkō-Hikyū Collection, manuscript no. 460. It includes the following three texts:
  1. Discourse on Almsgiving of the World-Honored One, Part Three (世尊布施論第三; Shìzūn bùshī lùn dì sān).
  2. Discourse on the Oneness of Heaven (一天論第一; Yītiān lùn dì yī).
  3. Parable, Part Two (喻第二; Yù dì èr).
2. Sutra on the Origin of Origins (大秦景教宣元本經; Dàqín jǐng jiào xuānyuán běn jīng); now held in Osaka, Japan, by Kyōu Shooku library, Tonkō-Hikyū Collection, manuscript no. 431. An inscribed pillar discovered in Luoyang in 2006, the Nestorian pillar of Luoyang, supplements the incomplete version from Dunhuang. Kojima manuscript B (大秦景教宣元至本經, Dàqín jǐng jiào xuānyuán zhi běn jīng, last known to be in the Dōshisha University library, Kyoto, in 1963) was at one time thought to be the conclusion of this work; see below ref. to Kazuo Enoki, p. 68.
3. Sutra of Hearing the Messiah (序聽迷詩所經; Xùtīng míshīsuǒ jīng); once known as the Takakusu manuscript; now held in Osaka, Japan, by Kyōu Shooku library, Tonkō-Hikyū Collection, manuscript no. 459.

=== Liturgical texts ===
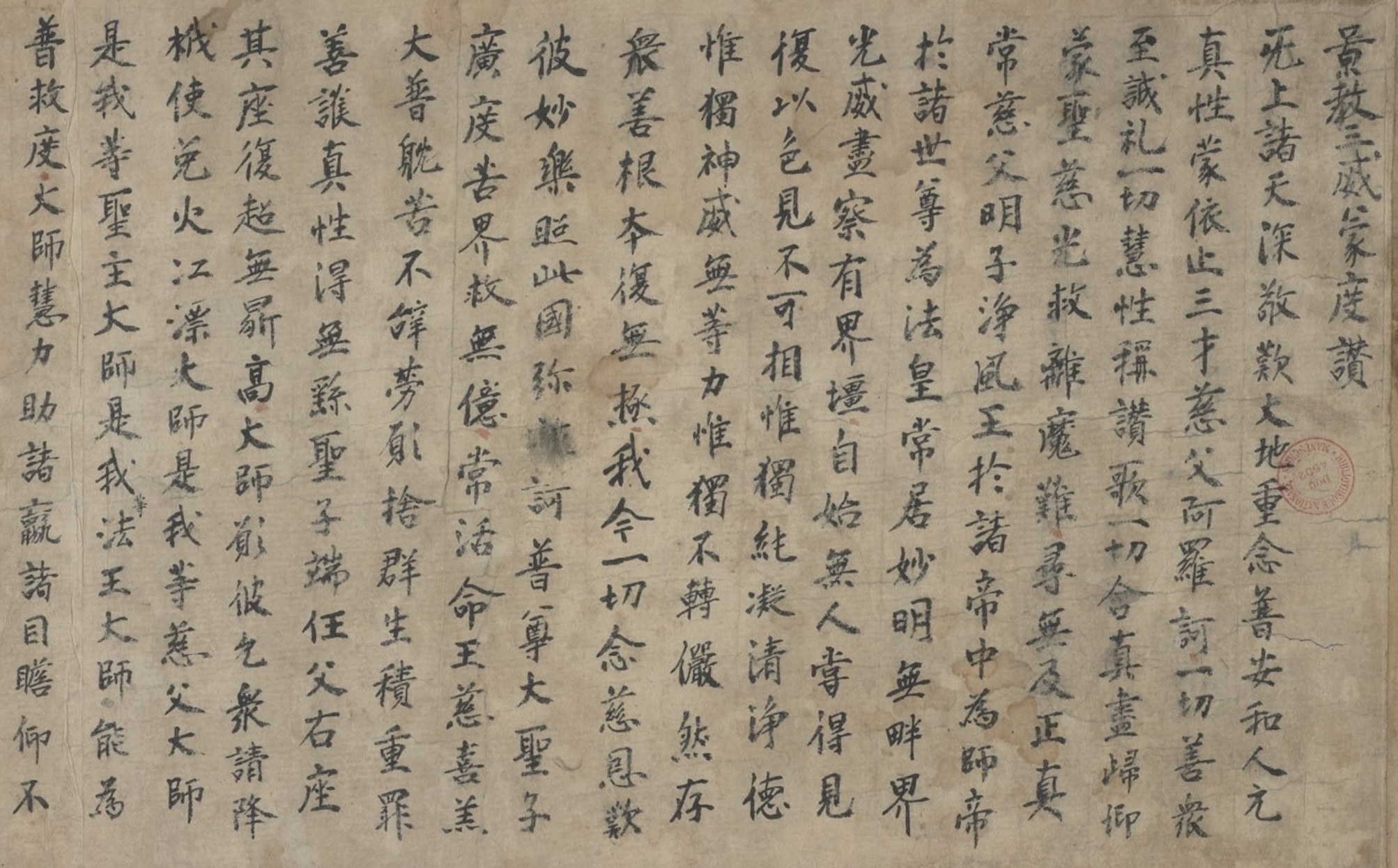
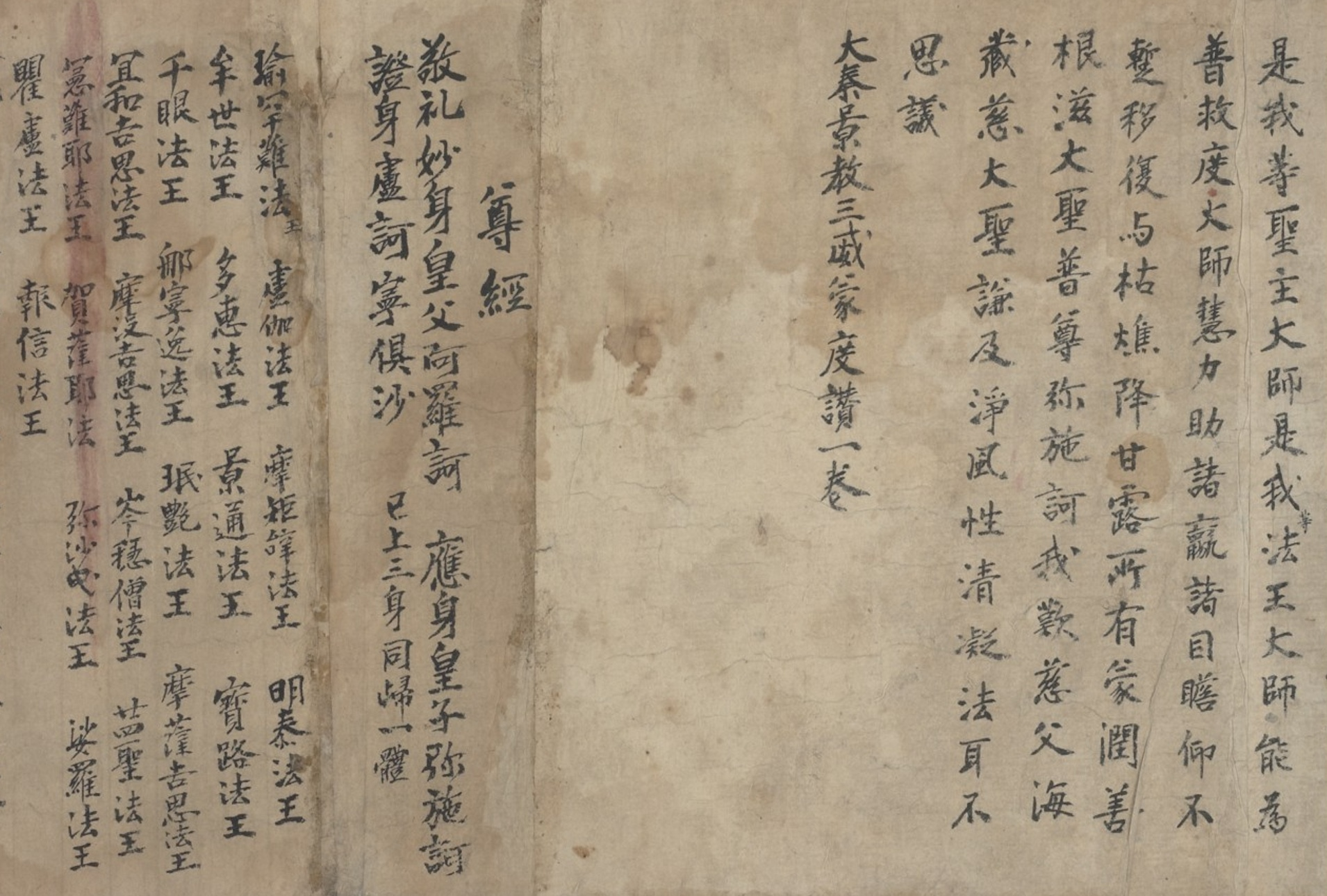
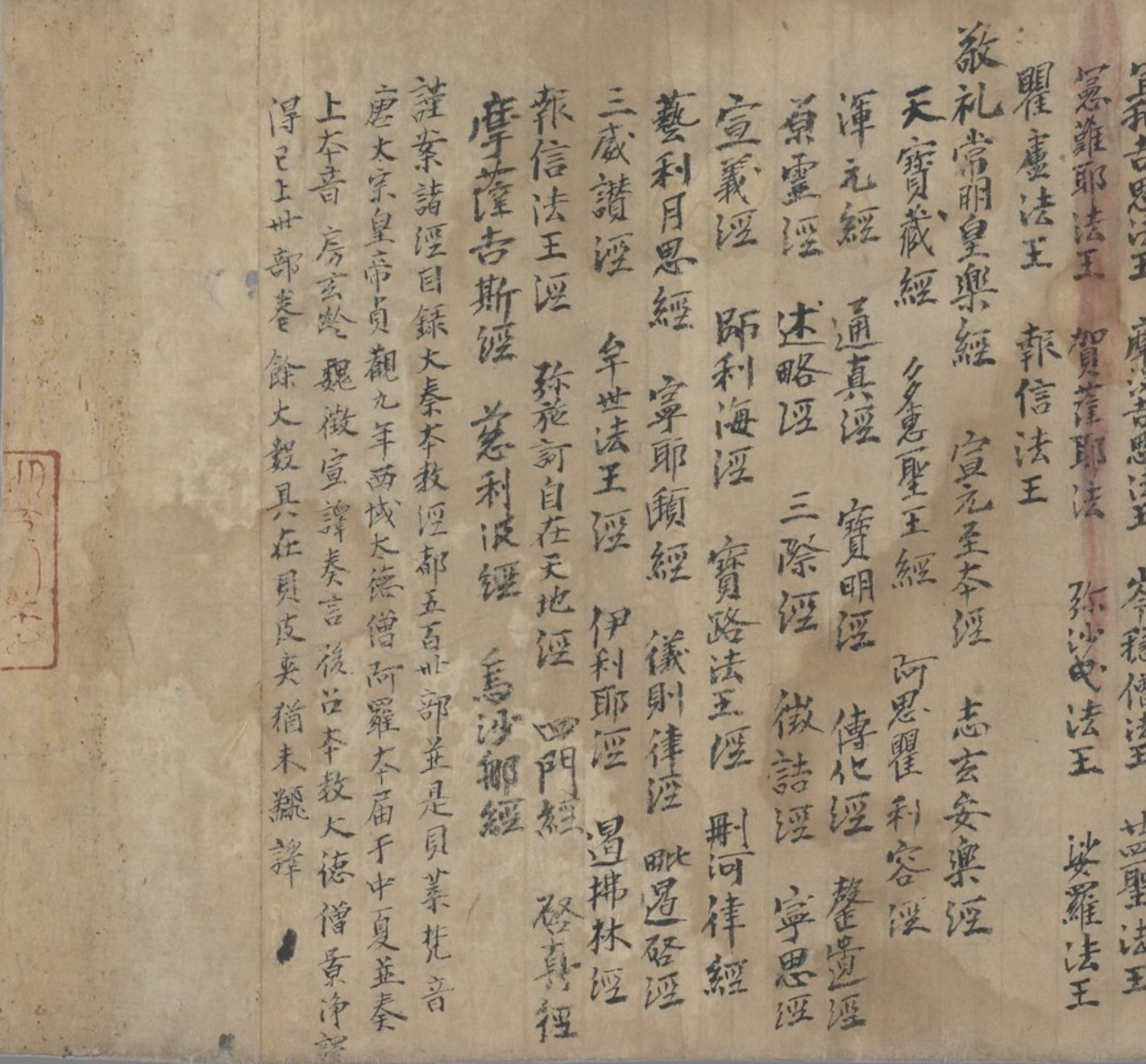
The original manuscript of Da Qin Hymn of Perfection of the Three Majesties and Venerable Books
1. Da Qin Hymn of Perfection of the Three Majesties (大秦景教三威蒙度讚; Dàqín jǐng jiào sān wēi méng dù zàn); now held in Paris, Bib. Nat., Collection Pelliot chinois, no. 3847.
2. Let Us Praise or Venerable Books (尊經; Zūn jīng), a list of sacred books followed by a short note; contained in the above manuscript in Paris, Bib. Nat., Collection Pelliot, chinois no. 3847.
3. The Sutra of Ultimate and Mysterious Happiness (志玄安樂經; Zhìxuán ānlè jīng); now held in Osaka, Japan, by Kyōu Shooku library, Tonkō-Hikyū Collection, manuscript no. 13.
4. Da Qin Hymn to the Transfiguration of the Great Holy One (大秦景教大聖通真歸法讚; Dàqín jǐng jiào dàshèng tōng zhēn guī fǎ zàn). Kojima manuscript A. This manuscript was stolen in Tianjin, China, in 1945 and its whereabouts are now unknown. This manuscript and Kojima manuscript B are suspected of being modern forgeries; see below ref. to Lin & Rong.

=== The Xi'an Stele ===
The Xi'an Stele was erected in 781 to commemorate the propagation of the Da Qin Luminous Religion ("Da Qin" is the Chinese term for the Roman Empire), and covers the preceding 150 years of Christianity in China.

Palmer recently claimed, on the basis of research conducted by scholars in the 1930s, that the Daqin Pagoda near Lou Guan Tai was part of a Da Qin monastery. Lou Guan Tai was the traditional site of Lao Tze's composition of the Tao Te Ching. Buried during a time of religious persecution in the 9th century, the stele was re-discovered in 1625 and is now on display in nearby Xi'an, the ancient capital of the Tang Dynasty.

== See also ==
- Church of the East in China
- Daqin Pagoda
- Xi'an Stele
