= Louguantai =

Taoist temple in Shaanxi, China

- 楼观台寺
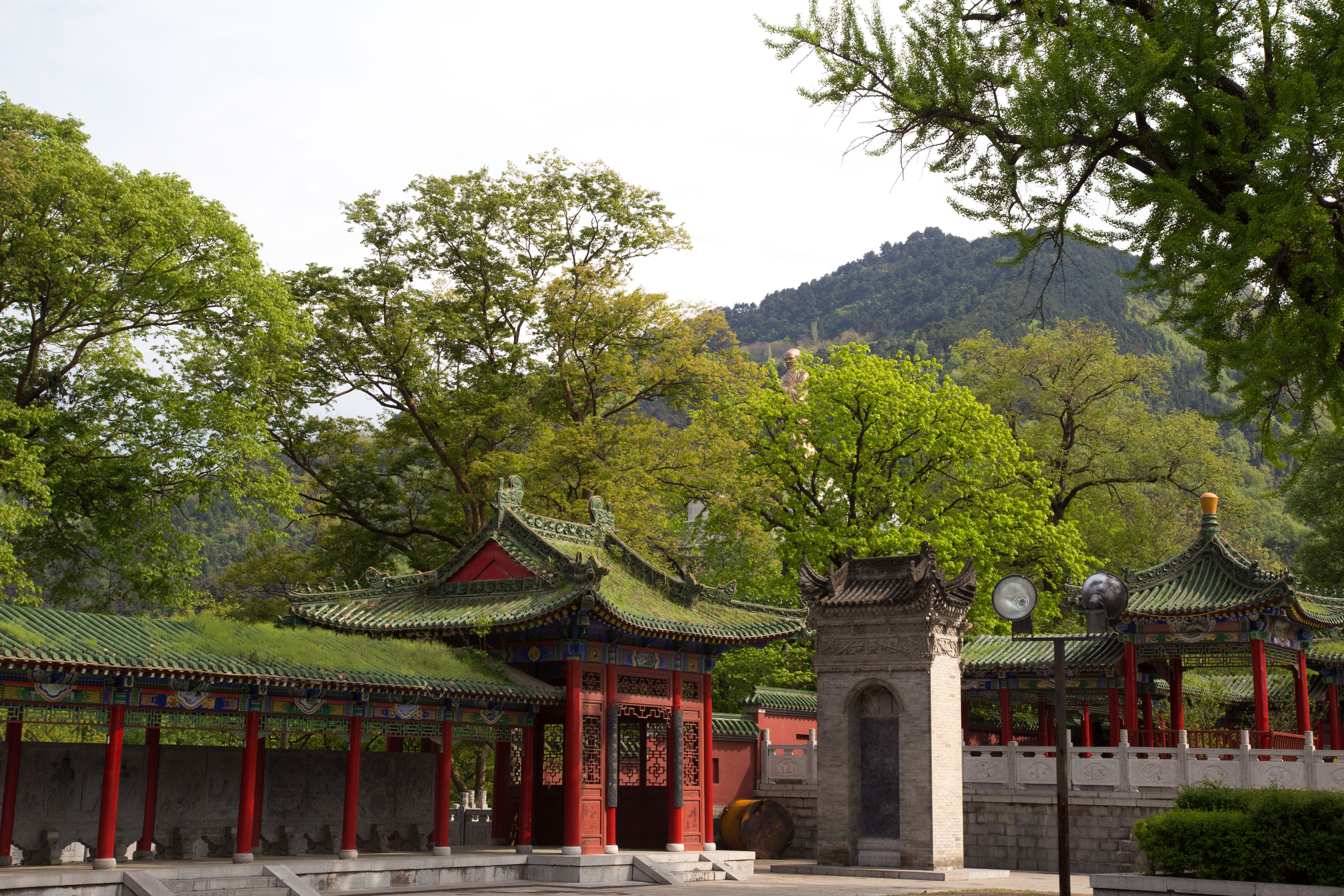
- Louguantai Temple

- Location within China

Religion
- Affiliation: Taoism

Location
- Location: Tayu village, Zhouzhi county, Shaanxi
- Country: China
- Interactive map of Louguantai
- Coordinates: 34°3′30″N 108°19′38″E

Architecture
- Style: Chinese architecture

The Louguantai Temple (Chinese: 楼观台寺), in Tayu village (塔峪村), Zhouzhi county, Shaanxi province, about 70 km west of Xi'an, is the place where tradition says that Laozi composed the Tao Te Ching.

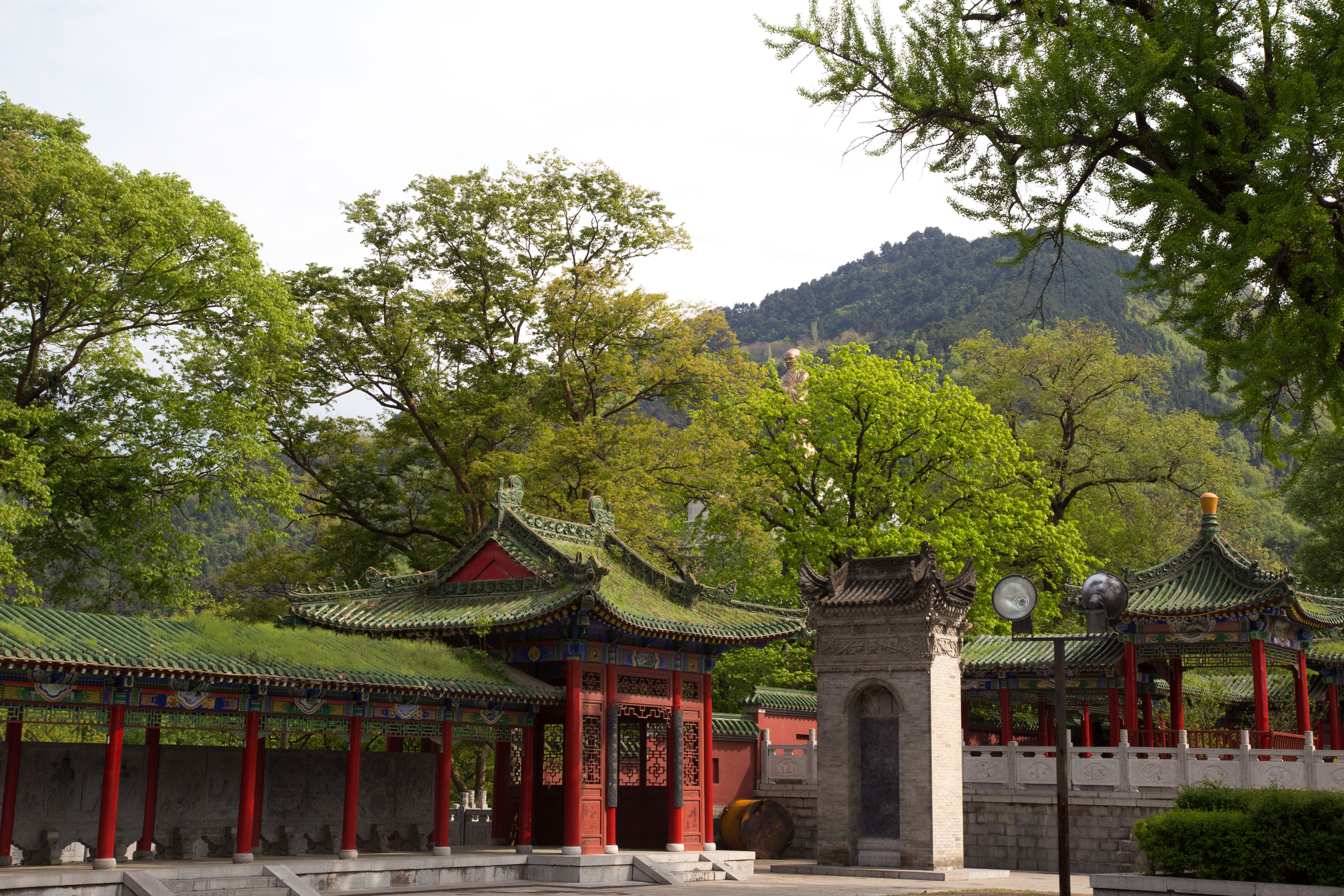
Louguantai Temple.

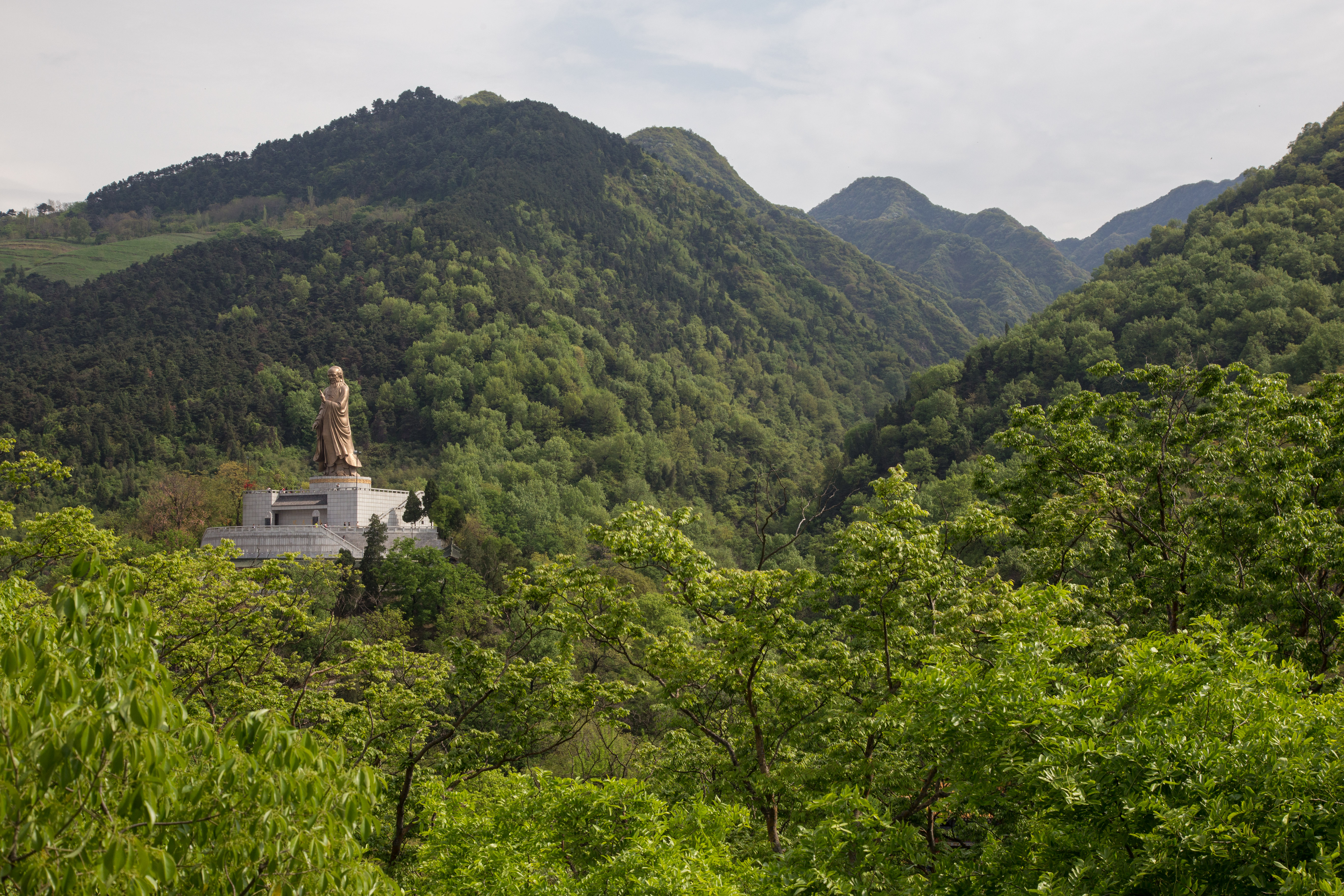
Lao Tze statue.

The Daqin Pagoda is located less than one mile to the west of Louguantai.
