= Turpan Manichaean texts =

Documents found in Bezeklik Thousand Buddha Caves

The Manichaean Turpan documents found in Bezeklik Thousand Buddha Caves include many documents and works of Manichaean art found by the German Turfan expeditions.

== History ==
Many important finds were made by the Turfan expeditions, especially on the second expedition, at a number of sites along the ancient northern route around the Taklamakan desert. They discovered important documents and works of art (including a magnificent wall-painting of a Manichaean bishop [mozhak], previously mistakenly identified as Mani) and the remains of a Nestorian (Christian) church near ancient Khocho (Qara-khoja or Gaochang), a ruined ancient city, built of mud, 30 km (19 mi) east of Turfan.

== Manuscripts ==
Manuscripts include Sogdian-language Manichaean letter.

== Art ==
Visual art includes:

- Leaf from a Manichaean book MIK III 4959
- Leaf from a Manichaean book MIK III 4974
- Leaf from a Manichaean book MIK III 4979
- Leaf from a Manichaean book MIK III 6368
- Manichaean temple banner MIK III 6286
- Manichaean wall painting MIK III 6918

== Gallery ==
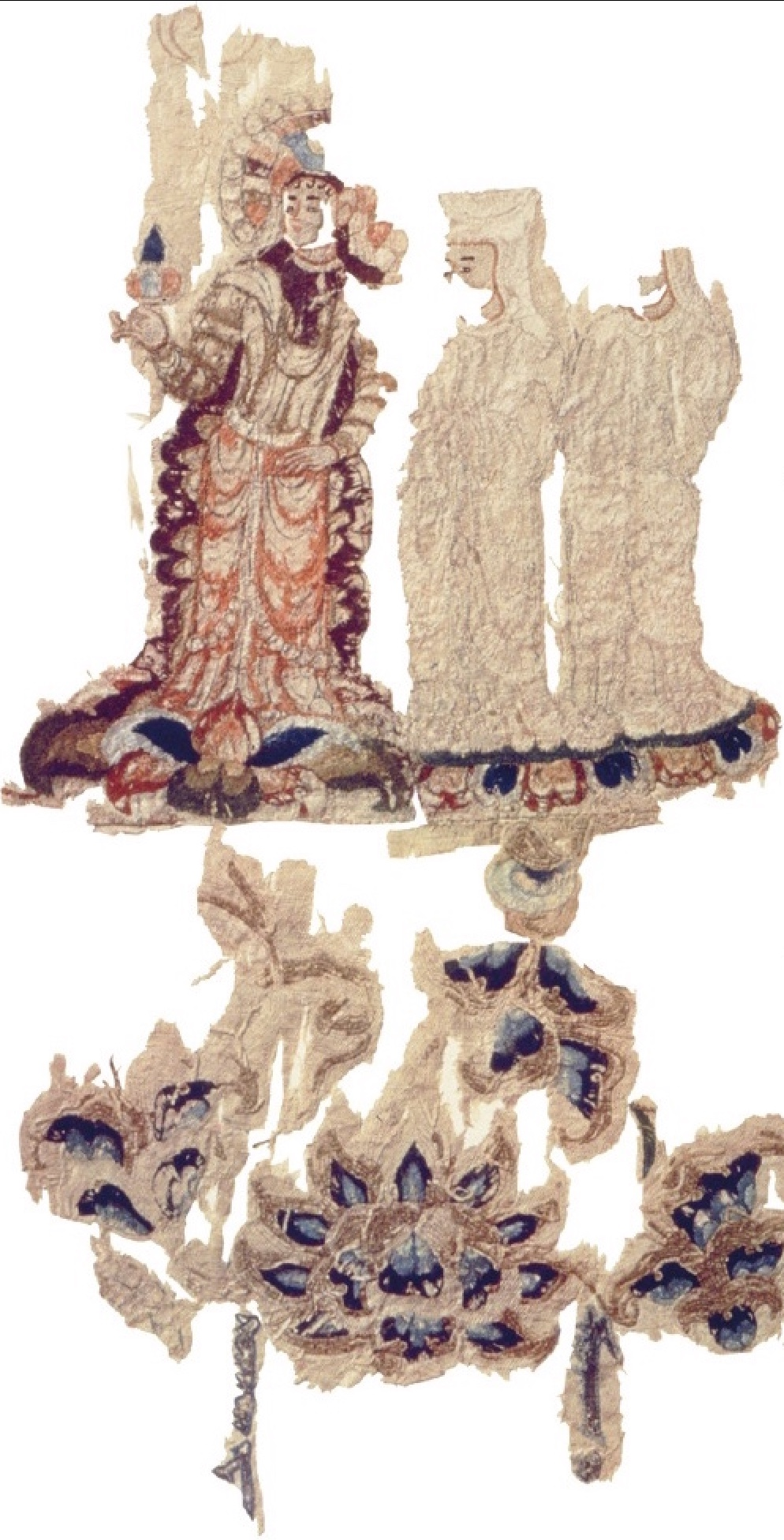
Fragment of Uyghur Manichaean hanging scroll "MIK III 6251"

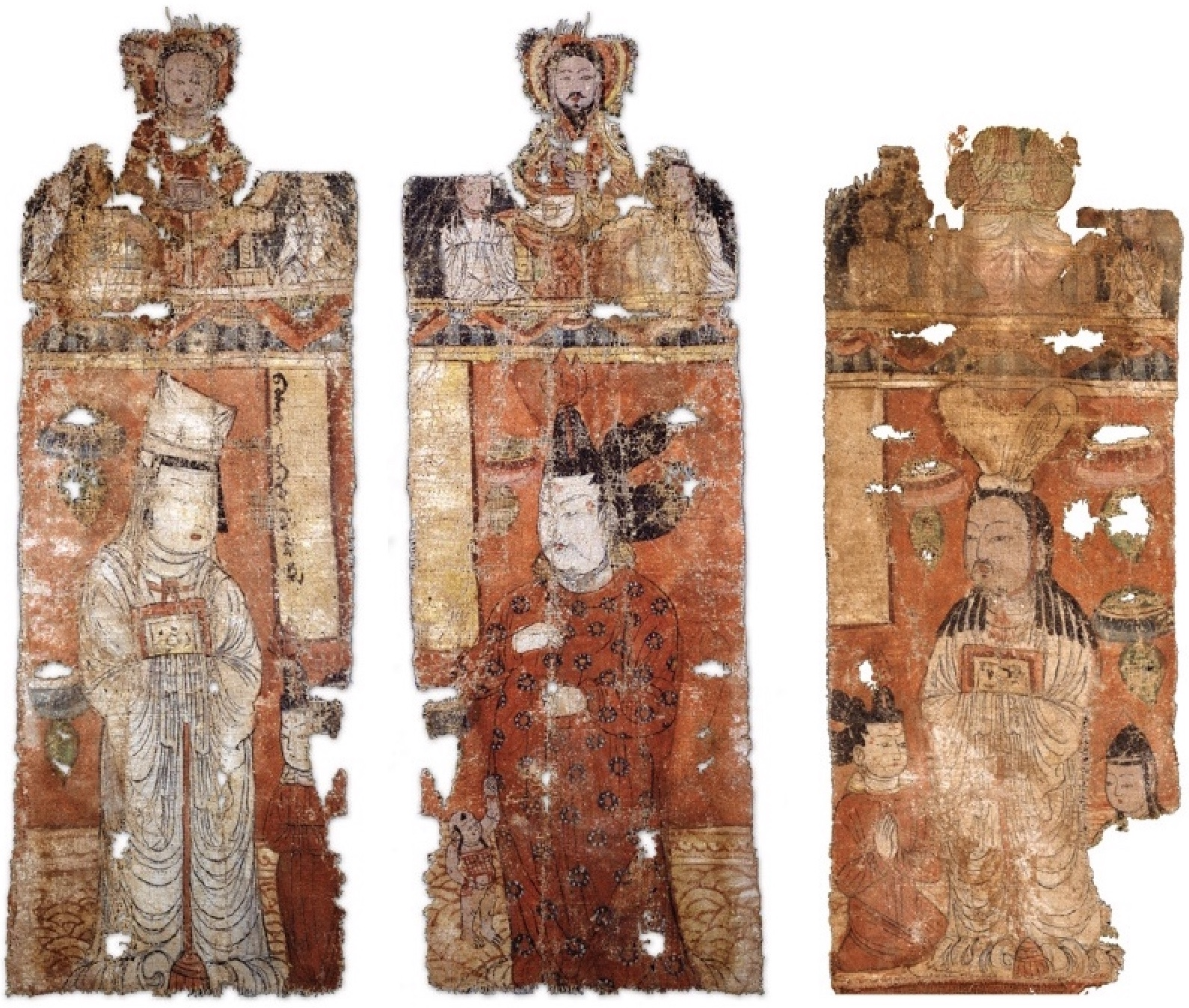
Manichaean temple banners "MIK III 6286" and "MIK III 6283"

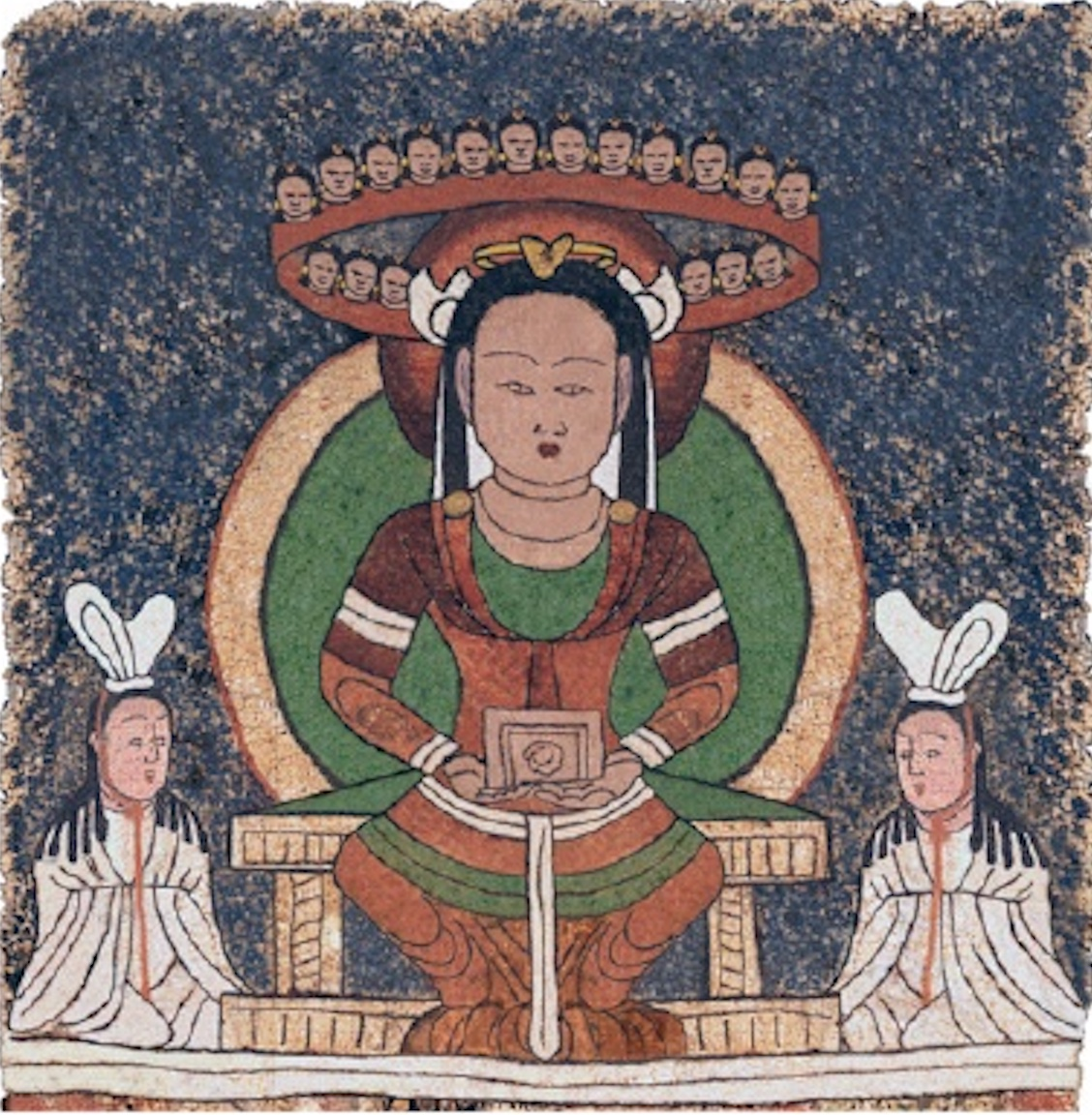
Reconstruction of the Light Maiden image on the Manichaean banner "MIK III 6286"

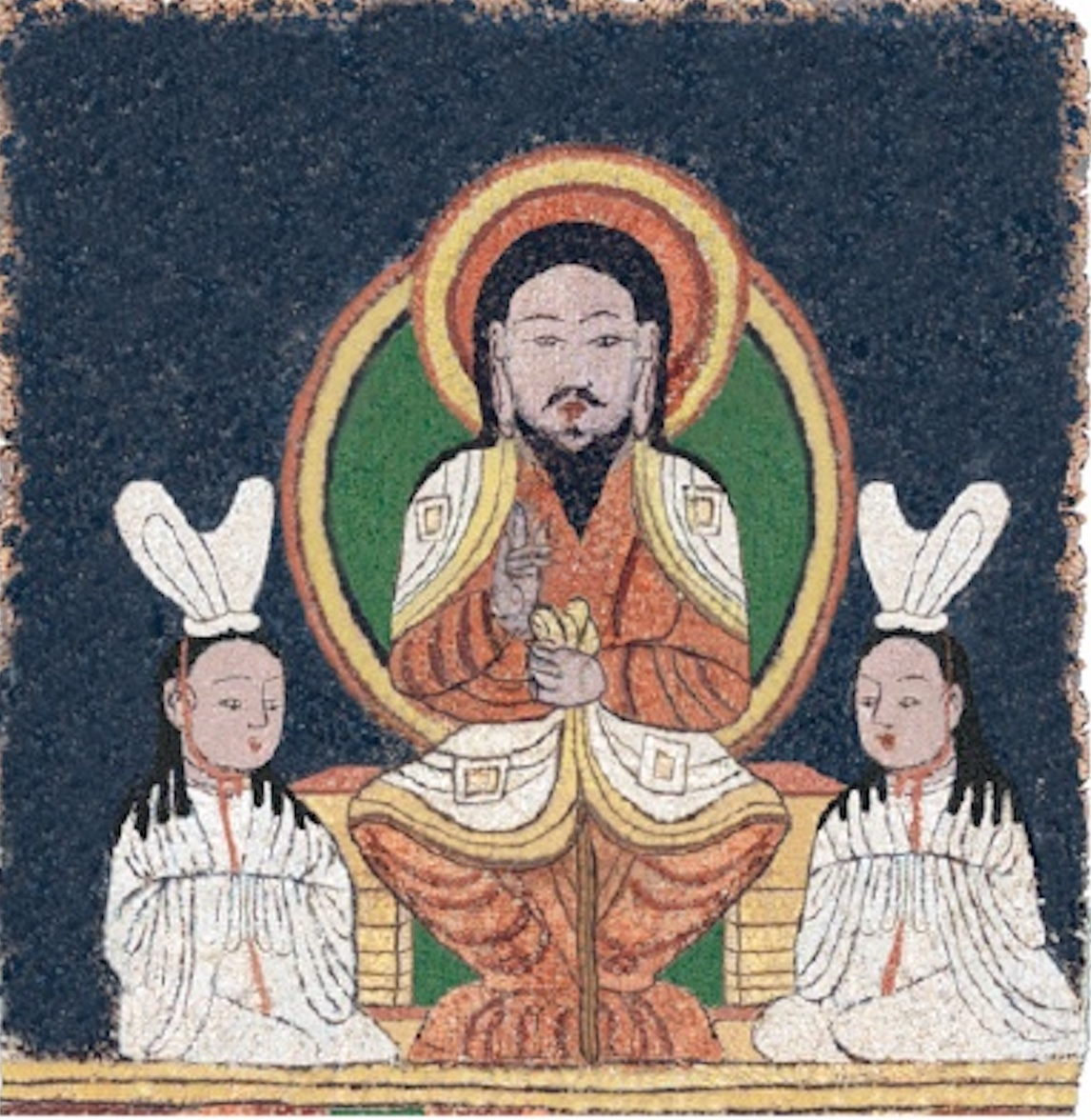
Reconstruction of the Jesus image on the Manichaean banner "MIK III 6286"

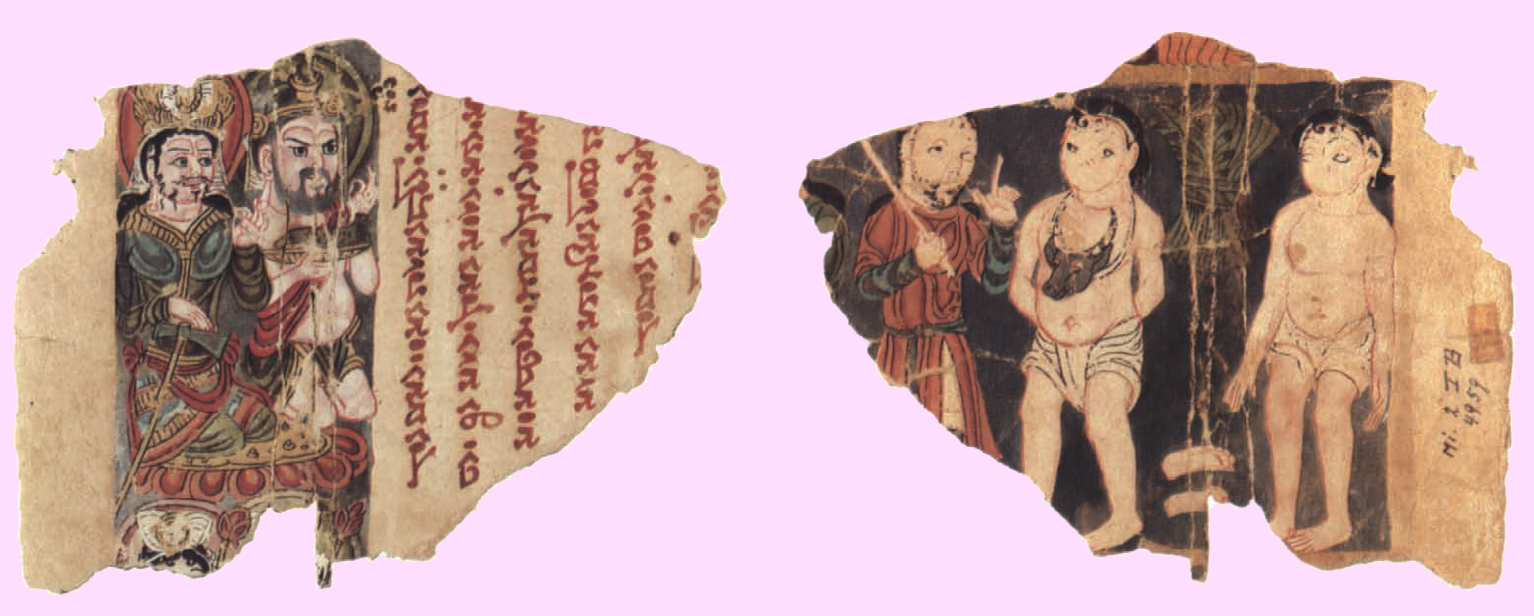
Leaf from a Manichaean book "MIK III 4959"

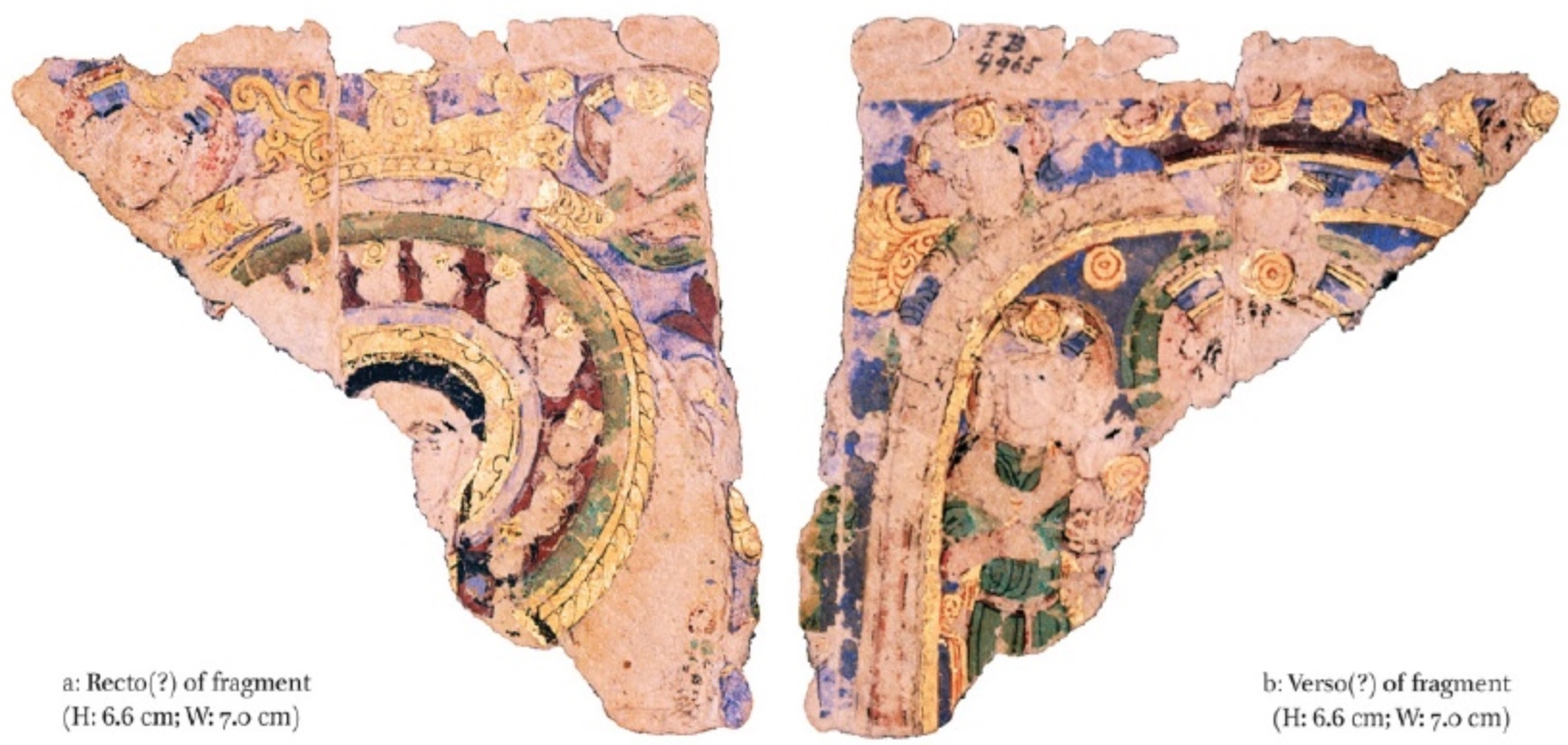
Leaf from a Manichaean book "MIK III 4965"

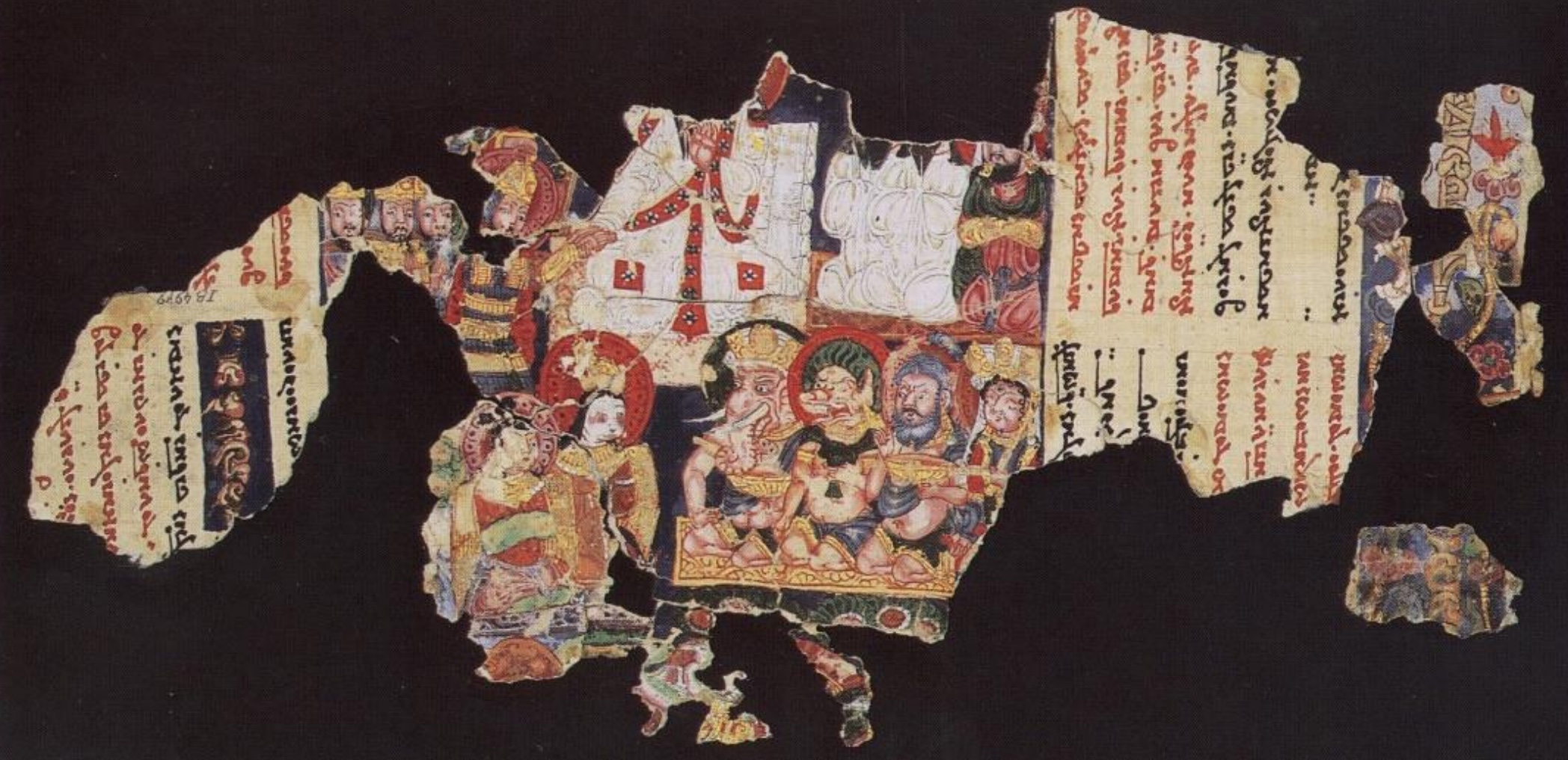
Leaf from a Manichaean book "MIK III 4979" recto

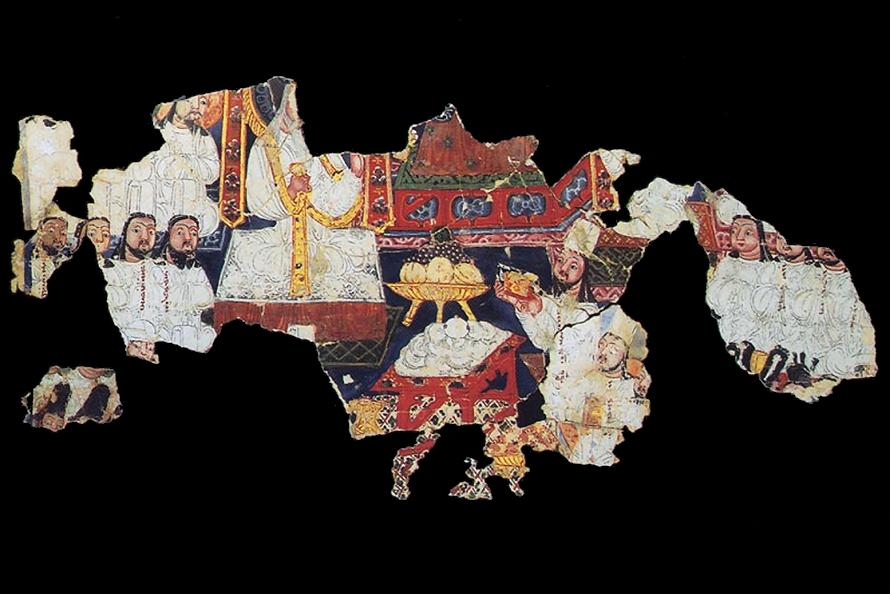
Leaf from a Manichaean book "MIK III 4979" verso

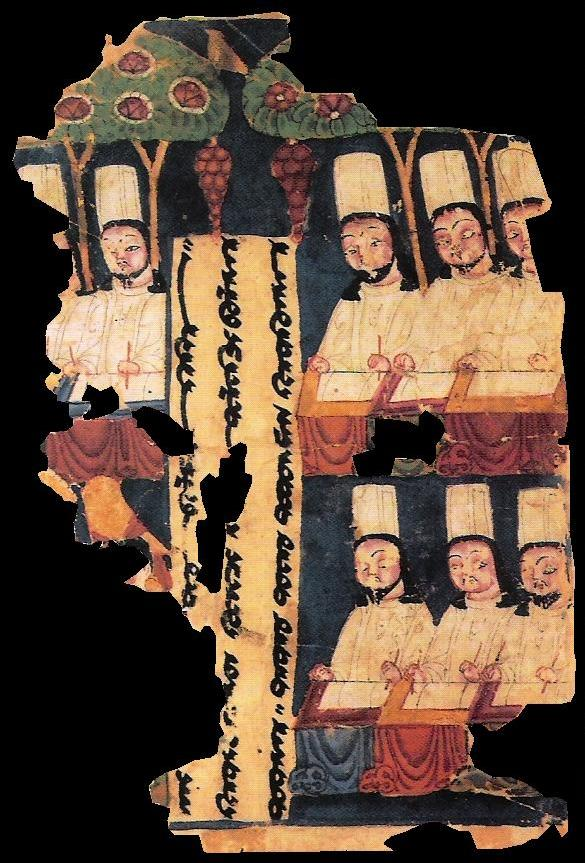
Leaf from a Manichaean book "MIK III 6368" recto

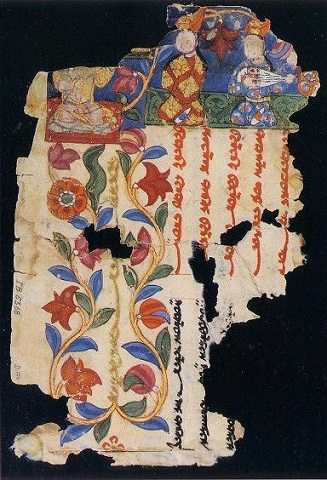
Leaf from a Manichaean book "MIK III 6368" verso

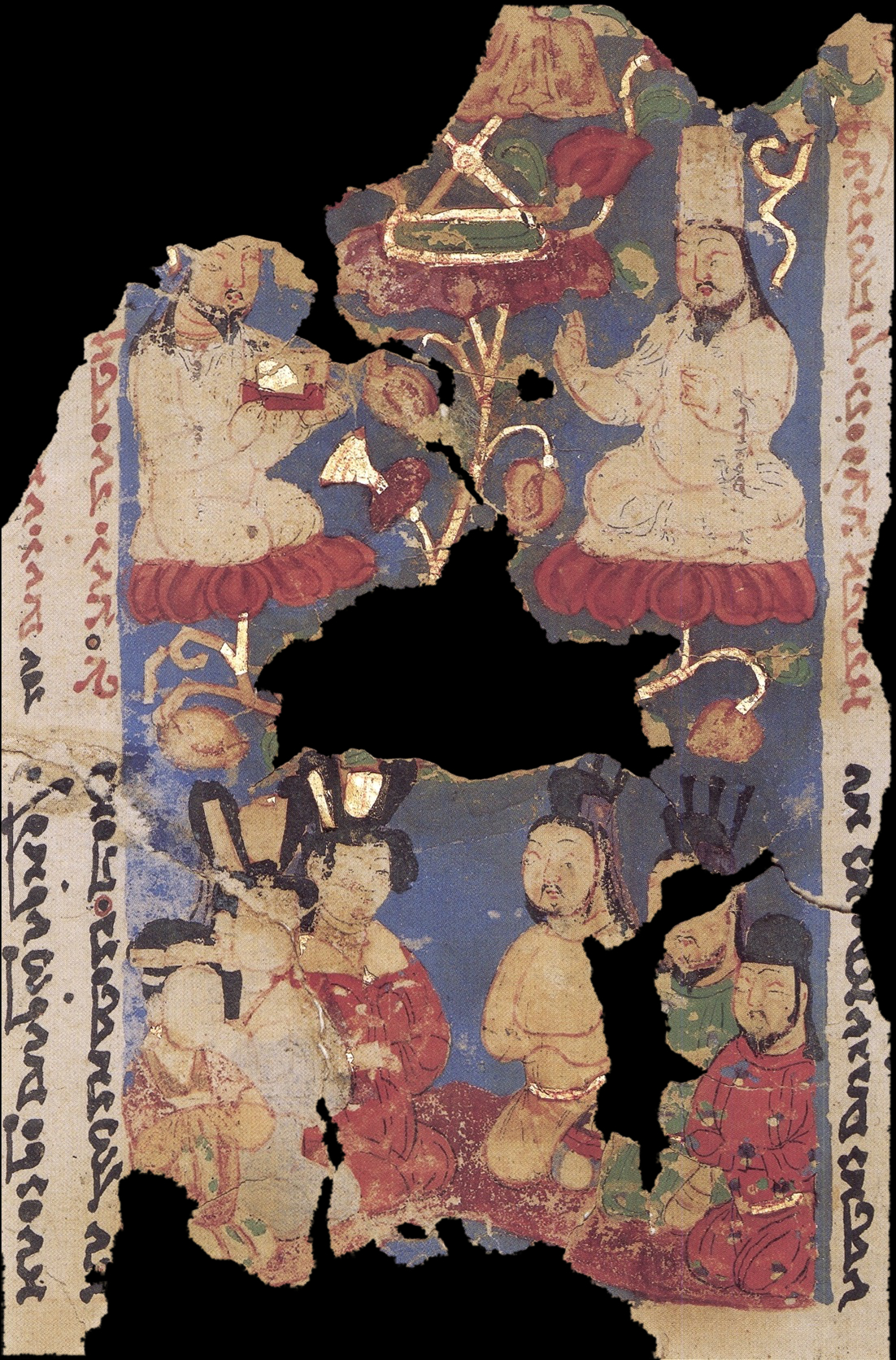
Leaf from a Manichaean book "MIK III 8259" folio 1 recto

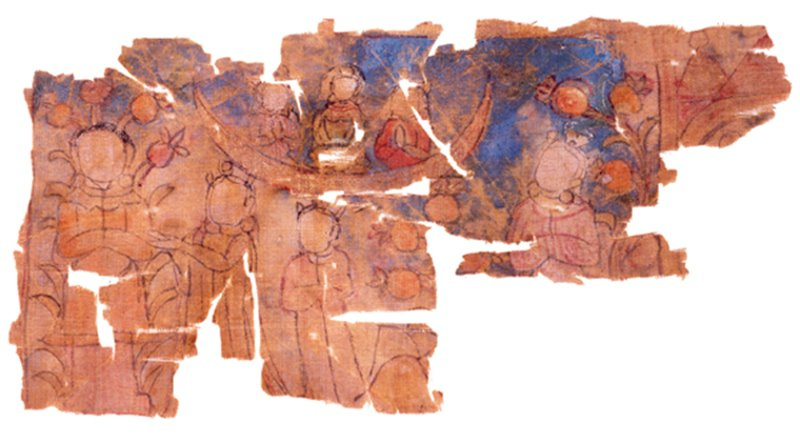
Fragment of a Manichaean textile display "MIK III 6278"

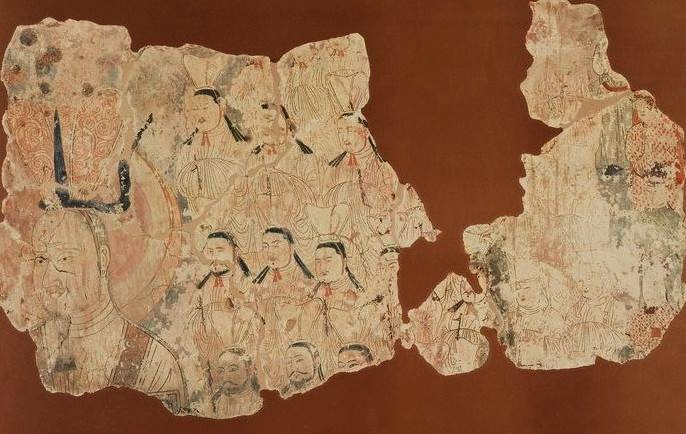
Fragment of a Turfan Manichaean wall painting "MIK III 6918"

== See also ==
- Dunhuang Manichaean texts
