= Manichaean wall painting MIK III 6918 =

Fragment of a mural from Xinjiang, China

Fragment of Manichae fresco MIK III 6918
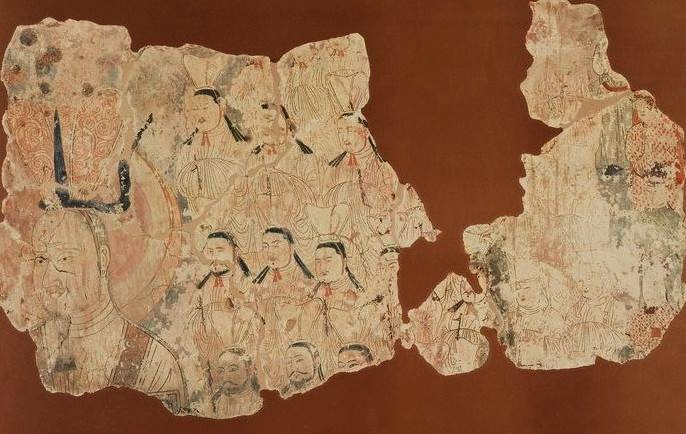
- Artist: Unknown
- Year: 10th century
- Type: Mural Painting
- Dimensions: 88 cm × 168.5 cm (35 in × 66.3 in)
- Location: Asian Art Museum; Berlin

Fragment of Manichaean Wall Painting "MIK Ⅲ 6918" is a fragment of a Manichaean mural collected in Germany Berlin Asian Art Museum, painted around the 10th century AD, and was found by the German Turpan expedition team in the ruins of Gaochang, in Xinjiang. The fragment is 88 centimeters long and 168.5 centimeters wide. It depicts a scene of worship in a Manichae church.

== Brief description ==
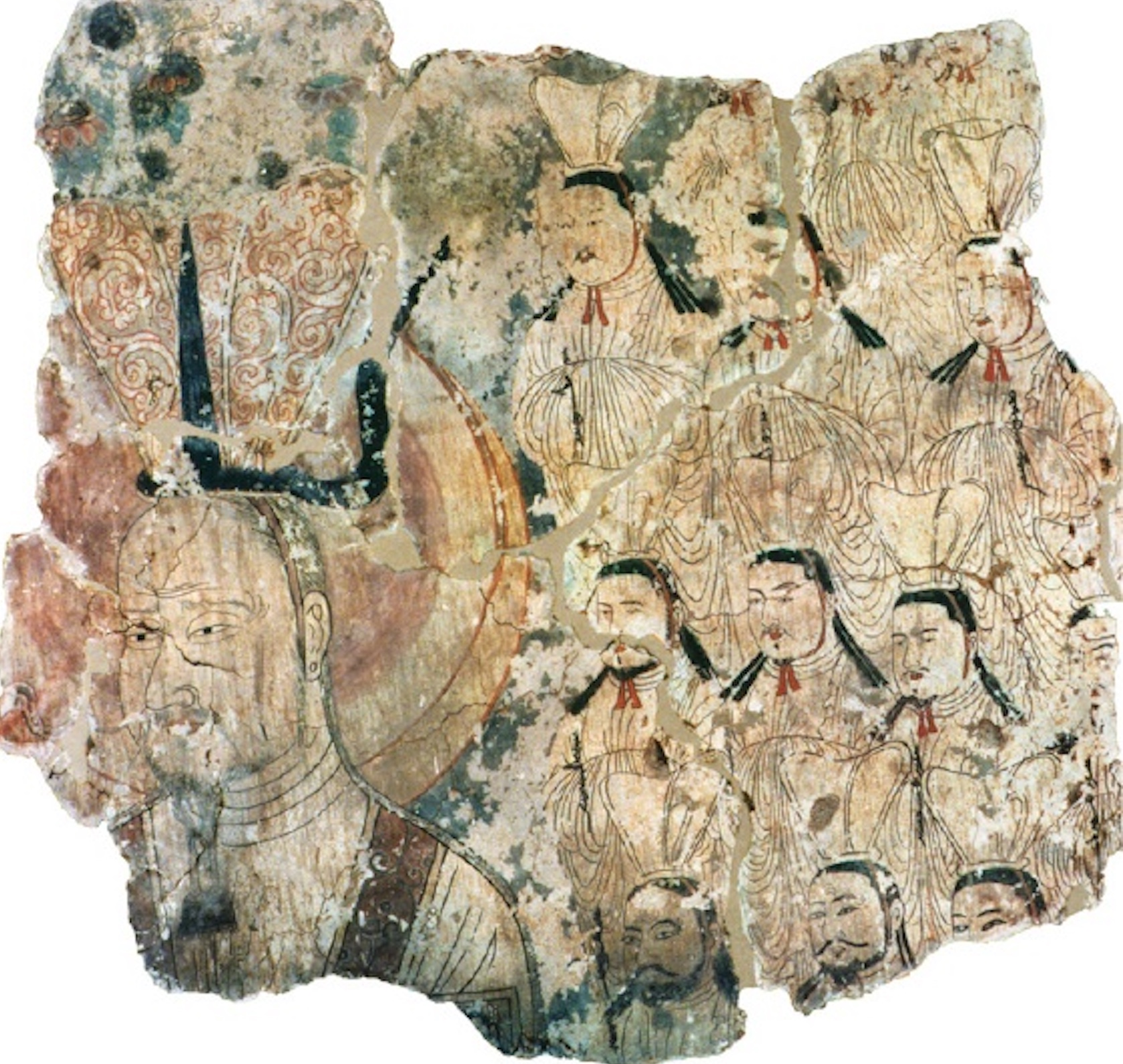
Mural left detail

This mural depicts the worship rituals of the ancient Gaochang Uyghur Manichae community. The leftmost portrait is the largest in the entire painting. It should be the bishop of the local church, that is, the "Oriental Bishop" (Mozhak [Bishop] of the East), the image has been wrongly judged as the portrait of the founder of Manichaeism Mani in the past. He wears a gorgeously decorated high crown, the most special thing is that the headlight behind his head shows a crescent shape, which looks like a crescent moon and sun wheel pattern as a whole. Behind him are many Manichaean elect and lay believers, both men, and women. They all wear white robes and white crowns. These are typical Manichean costumes.

== See also ==
- Fragmented pages of Manichaen manuscripts
- Veneration of the Tree of Life
- Sogdian-language Manichaean letter
