= Manichaean art =

Visual art forms associated with Manichaeism

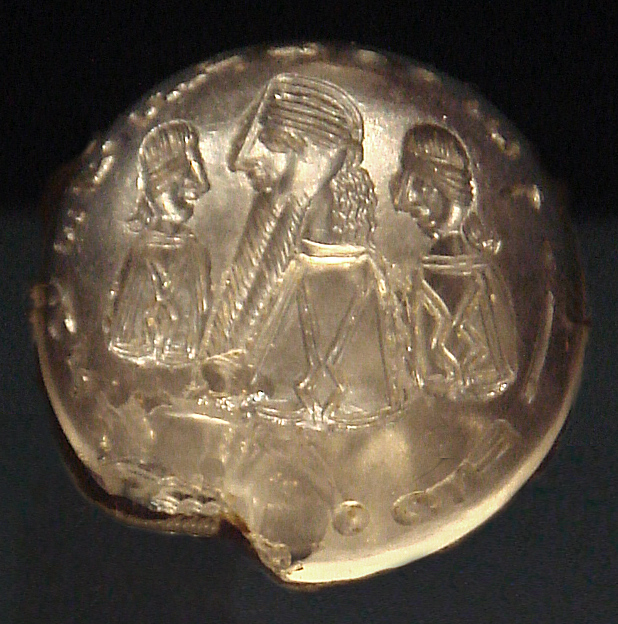
The seal of Mani, the oldest known Manichaean art

Manichaeism has a rich tradition of visual art, starting with Mani himself writing the Book of Pictures.

One of Mani's primary beliefs was that the arts (namely painting, calligraphy, and music) were of the same esteem as the divine spirit (Middle Persian: Mihryazd), believing that the creation of art was comparable to god's creation of living forms, and therefore the experience of art was more of a divine act than any other in the material world. Throughout the history of Manichaeism, didactic books of paintings were used to illustrate the religion's teachings and beliefs. From the beginning, the prophet Mani envisioned his religion (which included the teachings of Zarathustra, Buddha, and Christ) as a universal and therefore “transcultural” entity, leading to its vast spread from Europe to Asia. The Manichaean mission employed multifaceted means of communication (including oral, textual, and pictorial) so the beliefs may adapt to the variety of cultures it entered. These picture books covered the primary themes of Manichaeism, such as its dualism of light and darkness, maps of a religious universe, the process of human salvation, as well as various Manichaean prophets and deities, and were considered principal pieces of the Manichaean canon.

On the subject of Mani's original paintings, Dr. Zsuzsanna Gulácsi notes that the “paintings were created first in mid-third century Mesopotamia with direct involvement from Mani ... and were later preserved by being copied and adapted to a wide variety of artistic and cultural norms, as the religion spread across the Asian continent.” Gulácsi points to the Yuan-era silk paintings Manichaean Diagram of the Universe and Sermon on Mani's Teaching of Salvation as examples of sinicized variations of Mani's tradition of using a Book of Pictures as a method of teaching, specifically providing insight into the cosmology of the era's Chinese Manichaeism. After the discovery of fragmentary pieces of Uyghur-Manichean art in the ruins of Turfan, Western Regions, scholars began turning to the newly uncovered remains of Manichaean book art in order to assess through the fragments what could resemble the original style of the Arzhang.

== Illuminated manuscripts ==
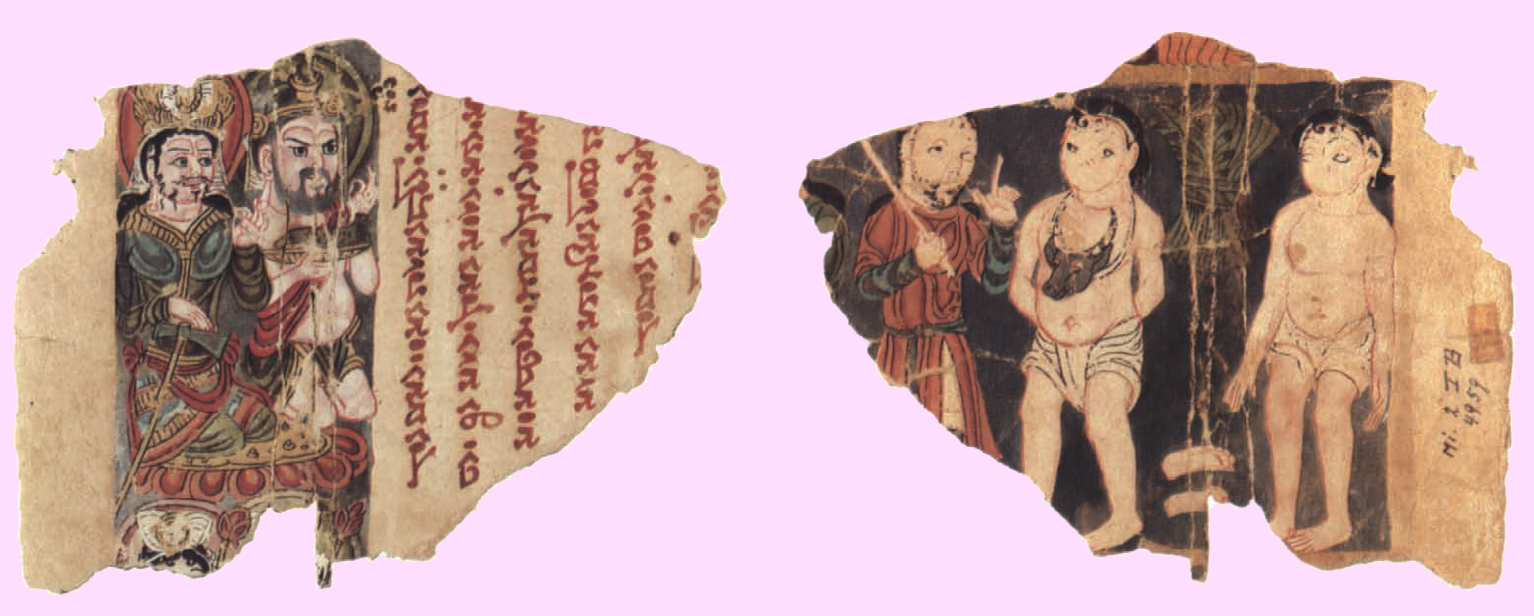
MIK III 4959 both sides

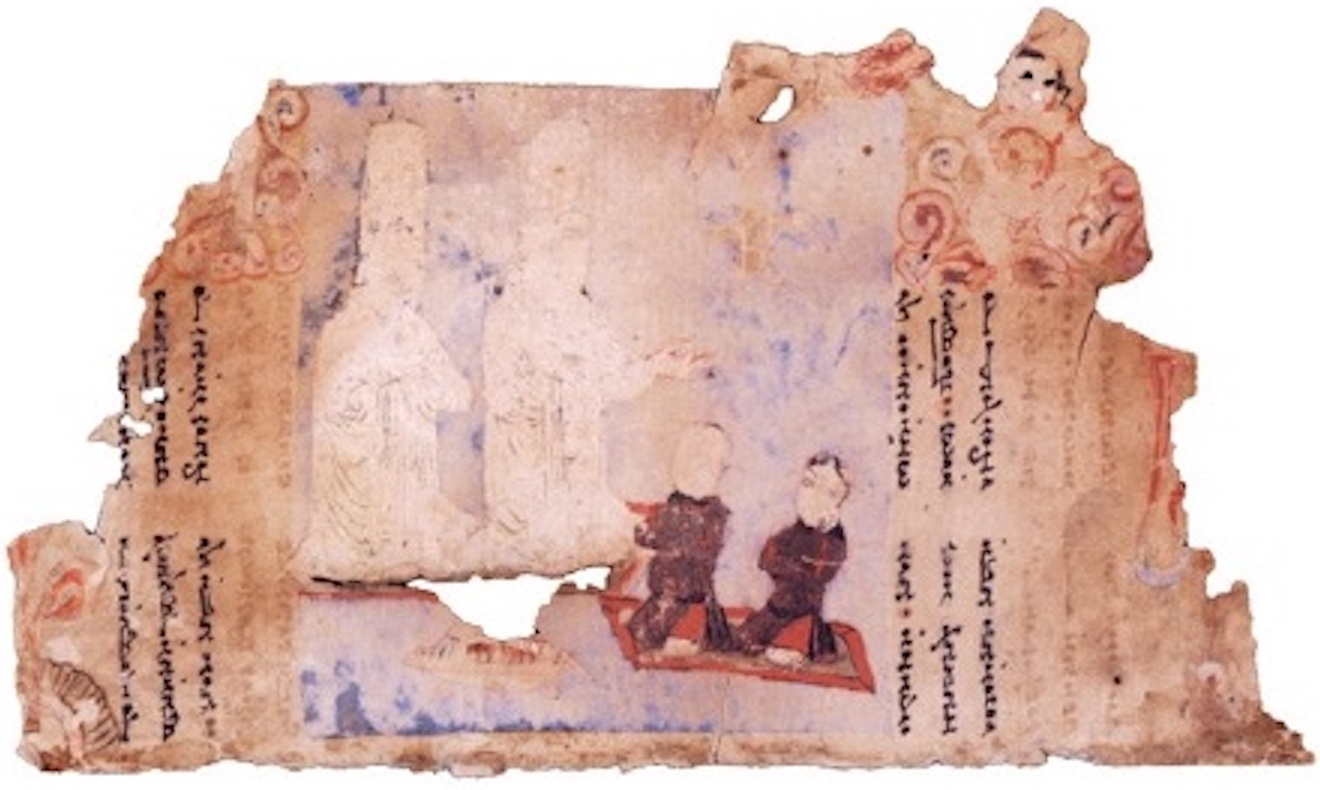
MIK III 4974 front side, back side is just text

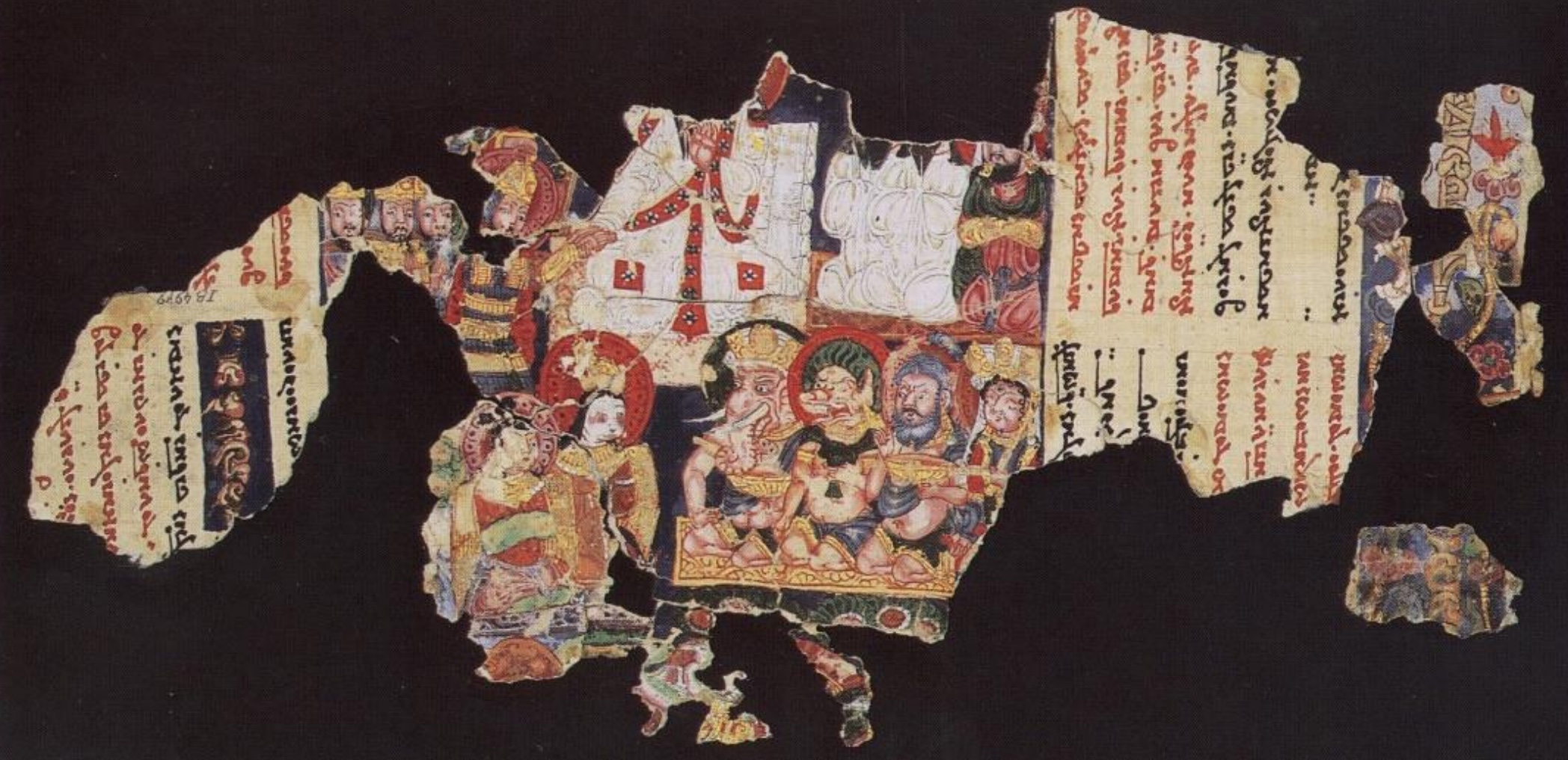
MIK III 4979 front side

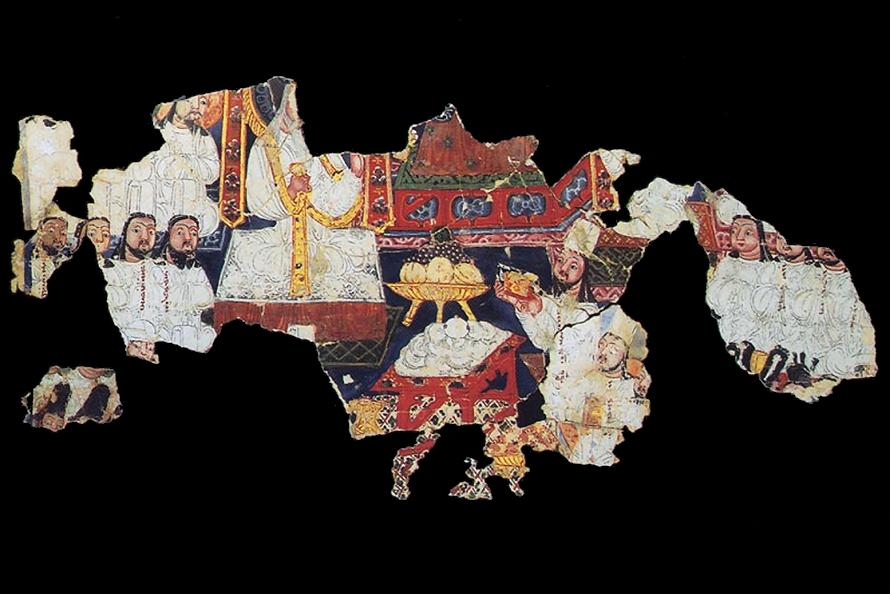
MIK III 4979 back side

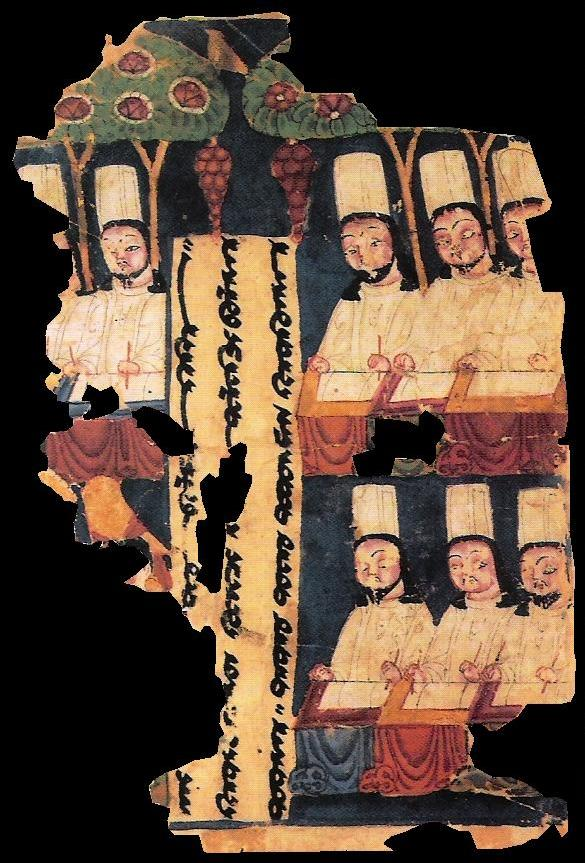
MIK III 6368 front side

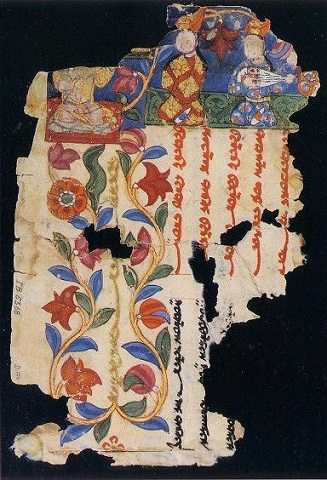
MIK III 6368 back side

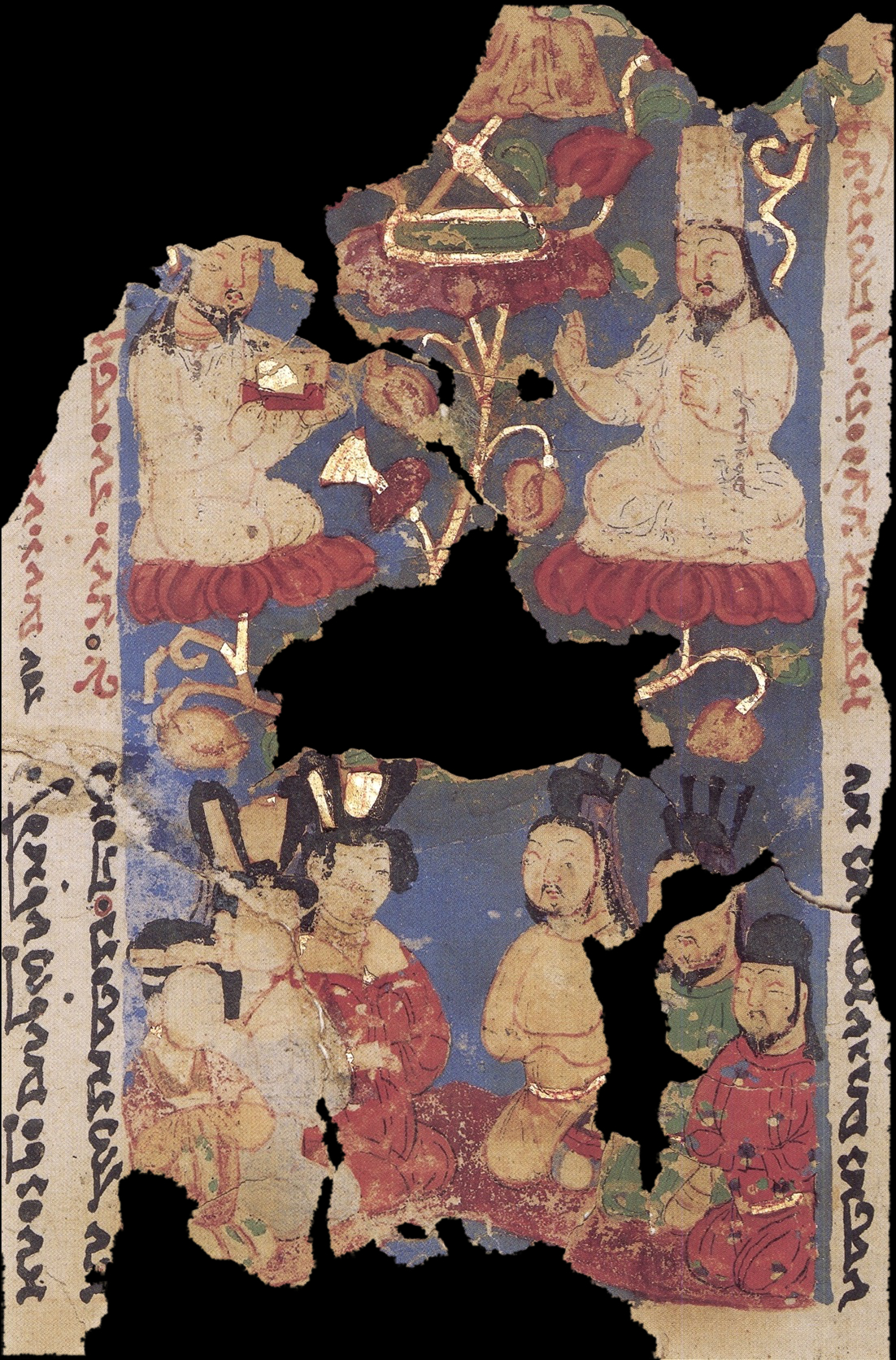
Leaf from a Manichaean book "MIK III 8259" folio 1 recto

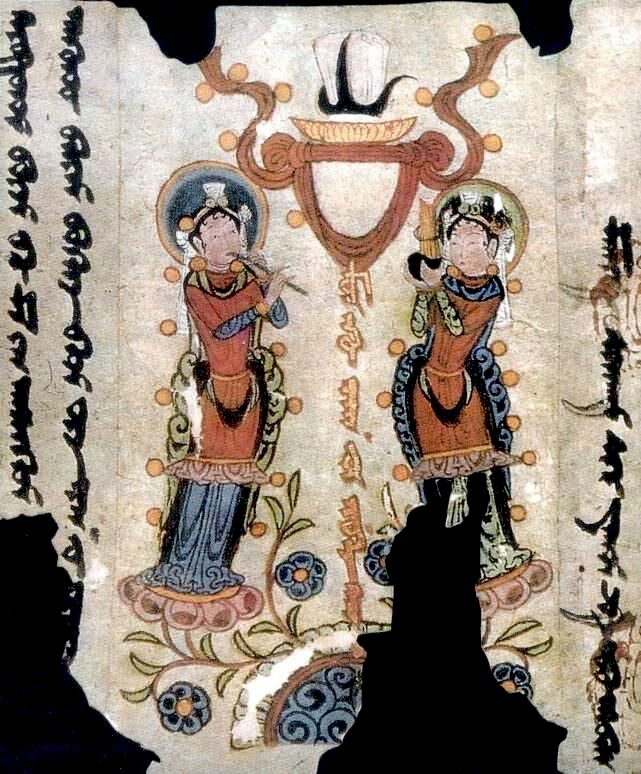
Illustration from the Sogdian-language Manichaean letter found separately from the other illustrations

Manichaean illuminated manuscripts are best known from a series of four manuscripts found in Gaochang Xinjiang

- Leaf from a Manichaean book MIK III 4959
- Leaf from a Manichaean book MIK III 4974
- Leaf from a Manichaean book MIK III 4979
- Leaf from a Manichaean book MIK III 6368

They were collected in Germany Berlin Asian Art Museum, drawn during the 8th-9th centuries, Was discovered in Xinjiang by German Turpan expedition team in the early 20th century. They are illuminated manuscripts with illustrations on both sides

In addition the Sogdian-language Manichaean letter, also discovered in Xinjiang contains illustrations of two women dancing, it was found in the Bezeklik Thousand Buddha Caves

== Silk paintings ==
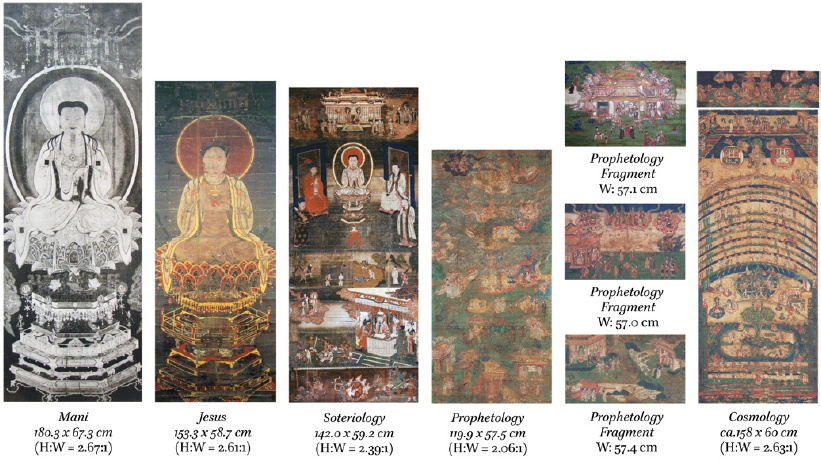
Eight Silk Painting Atlas

Eight silk hanging scrolls with Manichaean didactic images from southern China from between the 12th and the 15th centuries, which can be divided into four categories:

Two single portraits (depicting Mani and Jesus)

- Icon of Mani
- Manichaean Painting of the Buddha Jesus

One scroll depicting Salvation Theory (Soteriology)

- Sermon on Mani's Teaching of Salvation

Four scrolls depicting Prophetology (Prophetology)

- Mani's Parents
- Birth of Mani
- Episodes from Mani's Missionary Work
- Mani's Community Established

One scroll depicting Cosmology (Cosmology)

- Manichaean Diagram of the Universe

== Murals, reliefs, and banners ==
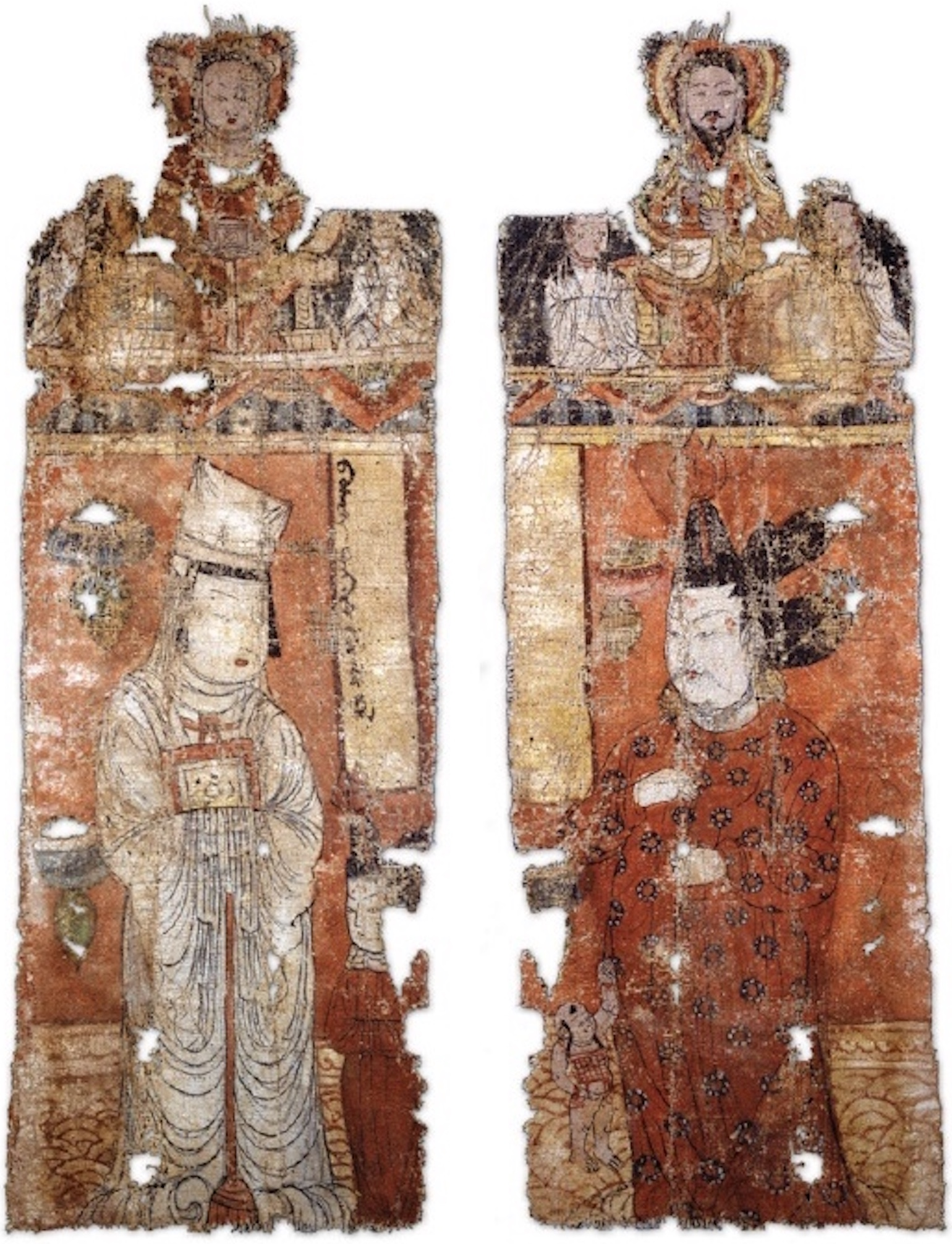
Manichaean temple banner MIK III 6286

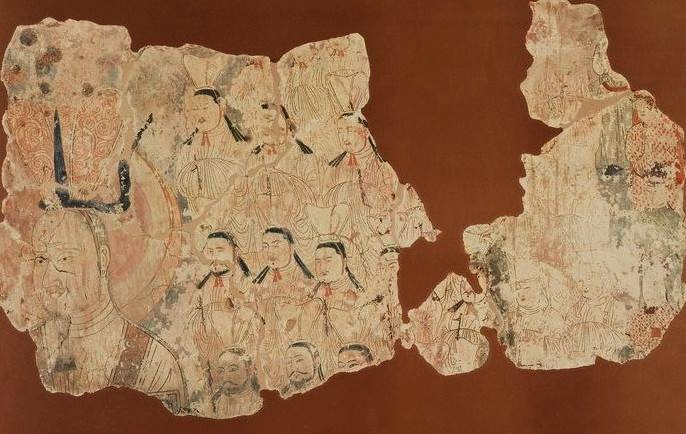
Manichaean wall painting MIK III 6918

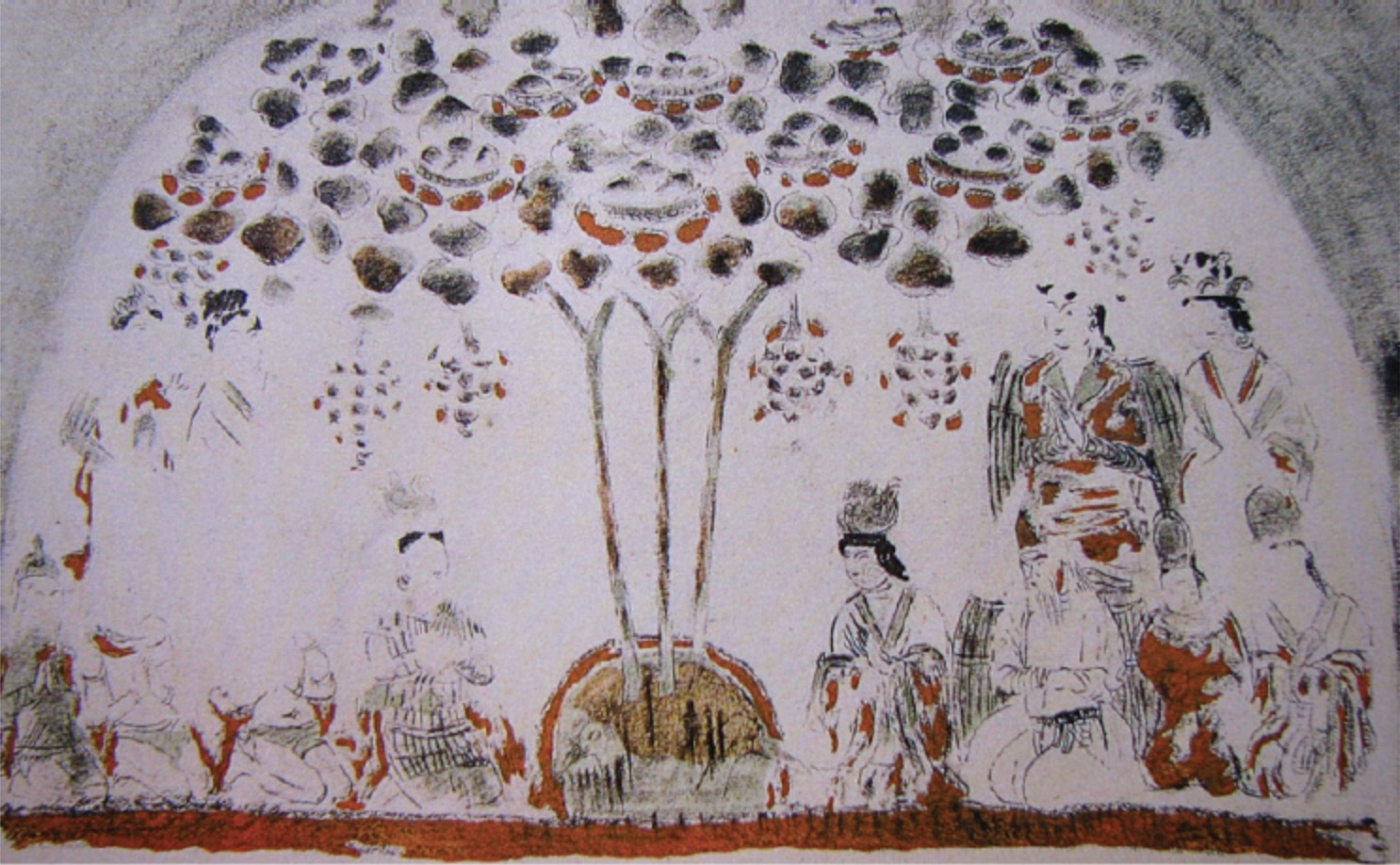
Veneration of the Tree of Life

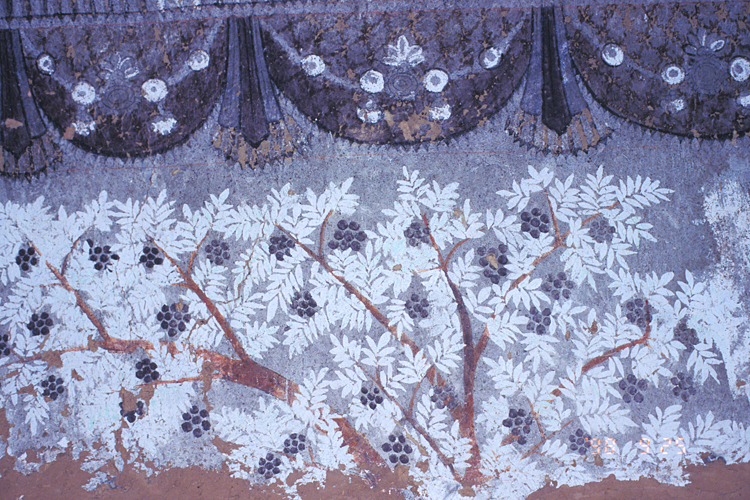
Mural depicting a tree with the vine bearing grapes, Sengim-aghiz Caves

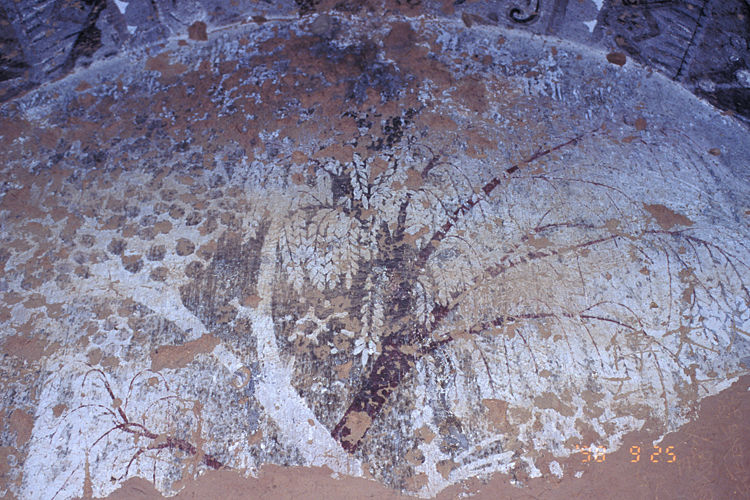
Mural depicting the Tree of Life and the Tree of Death, Sengim-aghiz Caves

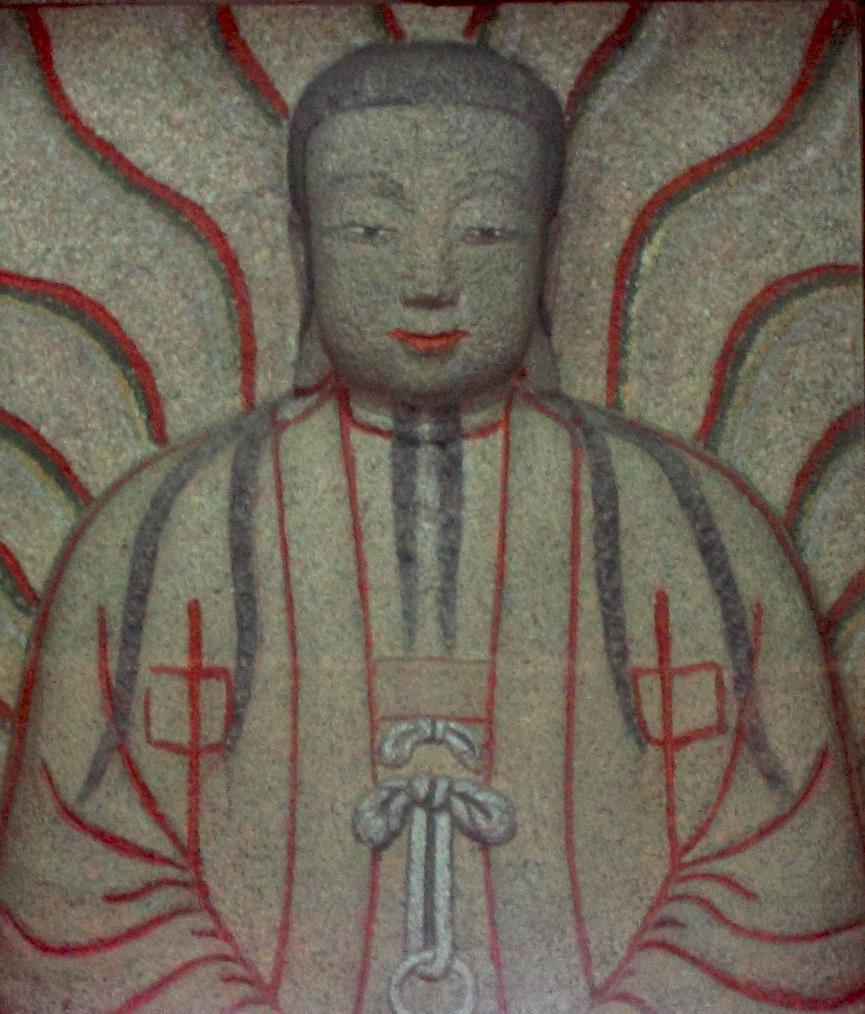
Cao'an image of Mani as the "Buddha of Light"

Manichaeism has a rich legacy of temple art including Manichaean stone reliefs of Shangwan village, Manichaean temple banner MIK III 6286, Manichaean wall painting MIK III 6918, and Veneration of the Tree of Life

Manichaean temple banner MIK III 6286 and Manichaean wall painting MIK III 6918 were both found by the German Turfan expeditions in Gaochang Xinjiang

Veneration of the Tree of Life was found in Bezeklik Thousand Buddha Caves, also in Xinjiang

The Manichaean stone reliefs of Shangwan village were discovered in Fujian in 2009 and the origins of the Buddha of Light at Cao'an were only rediscovered in the 1920s

== Influence ==
Following the discovery of Manichaean paintings in Turfan, art historian Thomas W. Arnold suggested that the Manichaean tradition of illustrative bookmaking was the source of Persian miniature painting style during the time of the Safavid Empire; Arnold stated: “The only other religious art that could have produced these pictures was the Manichaean, the Eastern Character of the types of face and figure, and the similarity in technical details to the Manichaean paintings that have survived in Central Asia, suggest that this is the source to which these strange pictures must be traced back.” Kamāl ud-Dīn Behzād, the most famous of the Persian miniature painters, was praised by the contemporaneous Afghan historian Albdulkarim Khondamir, who wrote; “[Behzād’s] Mani-like brushwork overwhelmed all other painters.” From her studies of the fragments, Zsuzsanna Gulácsi concluded that a set of the artwork come from an authentically Manichaean book of pictures, harboring elements (such as the iconography, brush style, and use of colors) that originated in Mani's original Arzhang and were turned into the traditional painting style of future generations of Manichaeans. Additionally, the Turfan fragments possess a primarily Persian appearance, specifically similar to the art that has survived from the Sassanid era (during which Mani lived), with such identifiable elements as the quality of the lines, the simplicity of the faces, and the exuberant amount of detail in the folds of the garments. These similarities link the Turfan fragments to what is known of art in the Greater Iran area before the arrival of Islam.

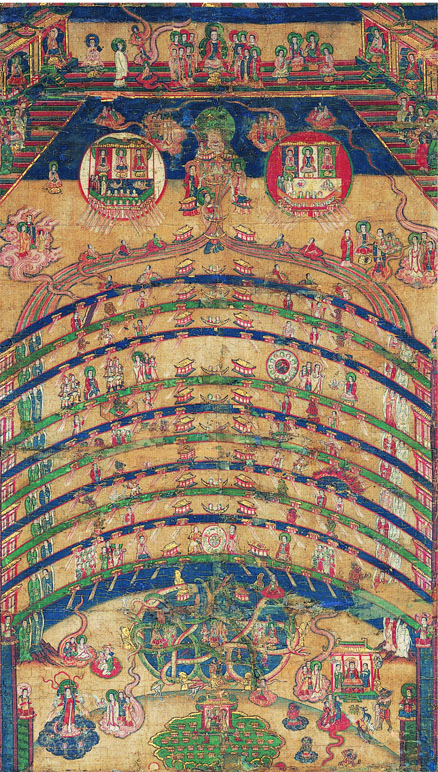
Detail of the Manichaean Diagram of the Universe, c. 13th-14th century

The Buddhist practice known as e-toki (絵解(き), meaning "picture deciphering, picture explaining”) was used by the Japanese Pure Land Buddhists as a method of teaching, beginning in China as early as 931 AD. Etoki performances typically filled halls with vertical scrolls that illustrated the story of the Buddha and various Buddhist principles. Like Buddhism itself, this practice spread into Japan from China. The scrolls also often illustrated the life of Prince Shōtoku, who is credited as the founder of Japanese Buddhism. During the Yuan dynasty and the Ming dynasty (during which the Hongwu Emperor banned Manichaeism in 1370), the Monijiao Manichaeans in southern China became close to the Pure Land Mahayana Buddhists, synthesizing the tradition of didcatic illustration that began with the Arzhang with the formal attributes of the hanging scrolls used in e-toki, while also syncretizing Buddhist and Manichaean beliefs.

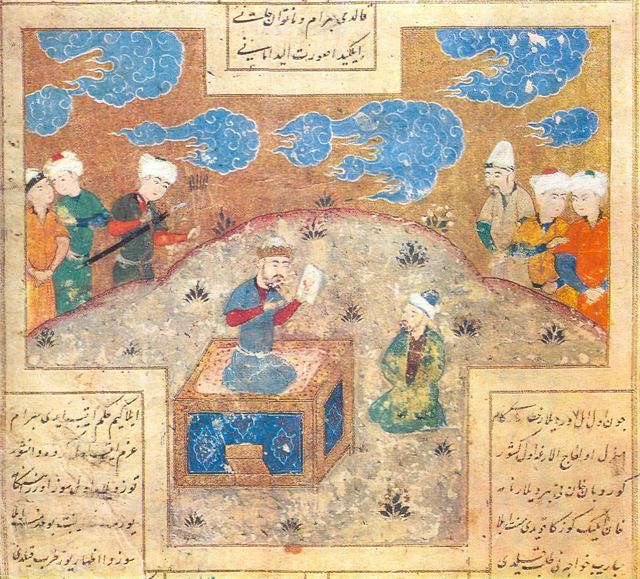
Mani presenting an illustration to King Bahram I in a painting by Ali-Shir Nava'i, c. 16th century

An Islamic account of Mani's life described the prophet as a painter who founded a sectarian movement against the Zoroastrian state religion of Sassanid Persia under Shapur I. Prompted by threats, Mani fled to Turkestan, where he gained followers and painted a few temples (incidentally, a few paintings in Bamyan are attributed to Mani). Mani then spent a year in the solitude of a cave after telling his followers that he was going to heaven. After the year, Mani returned with the Arzhang, which he said he had brought down from heaven. After the death of Shapur, he and a large procession of followers returned to Persia. According to this account, the new king Bahram I received and favored Mani, but he was later flayed alive for his heresies. In a 16th-century painting by Ali-Shir Nava'i from modern-day Uzbekistan, Mani is shown at the throne Bahram as the king inspects one of the prophet's illustrations.

In Islamic tradition (excluding Ibn al-Nadim’s account of Mani’s life) Mani is referred to as "Mani the Painter", almost always replacing the topos of "Founder of a Religion". In addition, Arzhang is the name of the daeva (demon) in Ferdowsi's Shahnameh who takes Kay Kāvus to Mazanderan, and whom Rostam defeats in his sixth trial. The word "arzhang" meaning "worthy" in Middle Persian is likely the reason for the shared names, although it is coincidental (if Thomas W. Arnold's theory on the Manichaean origin of Persian miniature painting is correct) that the character of Arzhang first would've been illustrated in the style of the Arzhang.

== See also ==
- Arzhang

== Literature ==
- Lieu, Samuel N. C. (1992), Manichaeism in the Later Roman Empire and Medieval China, Volume 63 of Wissenschaftliche Untersuchungen Zum Neuen Testament (2 ed.), Mohr Siebeck, ISBN 3161458206
- Gulácsi, Zsuzsanna (2005). Mediaeval Manichaean Book Art: A Codicological Study of Iranian and Turkic Illuminated Book Fragments from 8th-11th Century East Central Asia. Nag Hammadi and Manichaean Studies. Vol. 57. Leiden: Brill. ISBN 978-90-474-0596-2.
- Gulácsi, Zsuzsanna (2016). Mani's Pictures: The Didactic Images of the Manichaeans from Sasanian Mesopotamia to Uygur Central Asia and Tang-Ming China. Nag Hammadi and Manichaean Studies. Vol. 90. Leiden: Brill. ISBN 978-90-04-30894-7.
