= Leaf from a Manichaean book MIK III 4974 =

Manichaean manuscript fragment

Fragment of Manichae Manuscript MIK III 4974
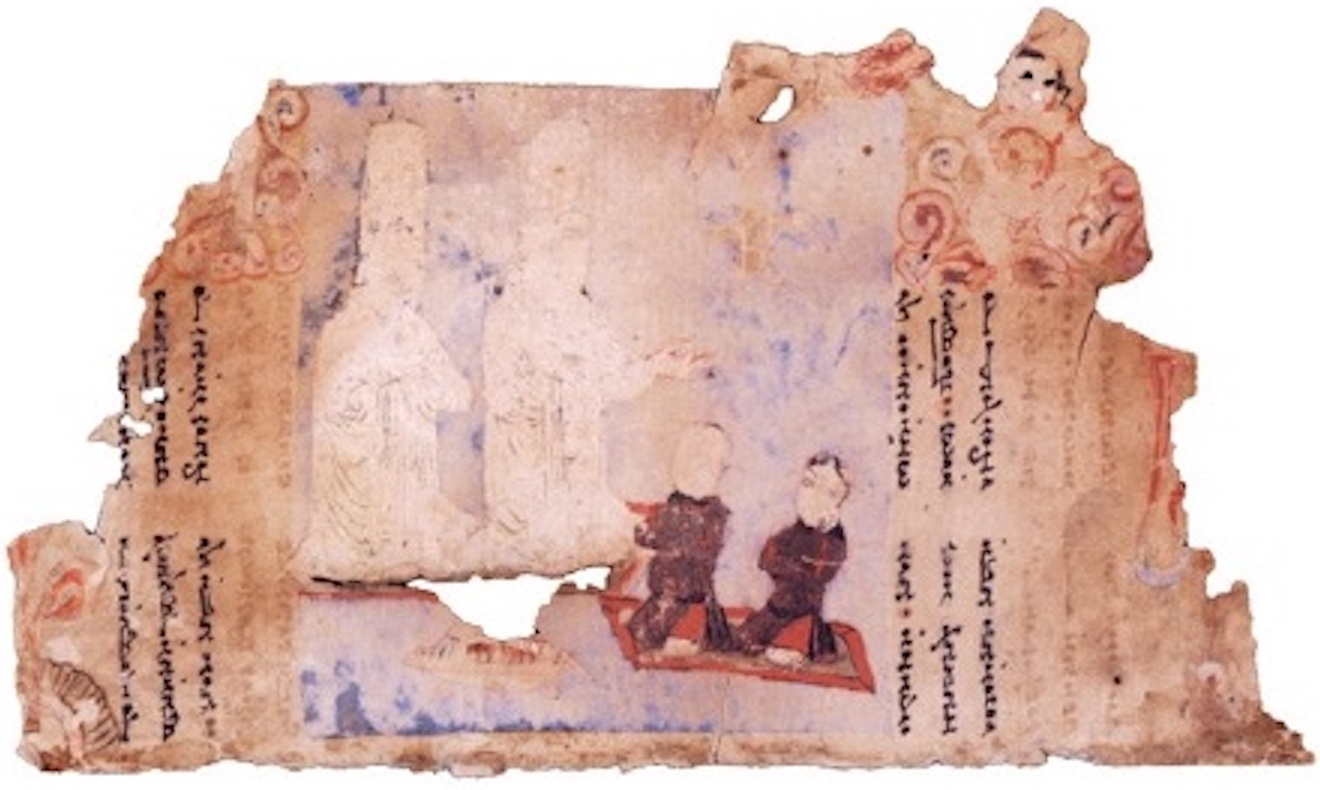
- The top image: the front of the torn page; the bottom image: the back of the torn page

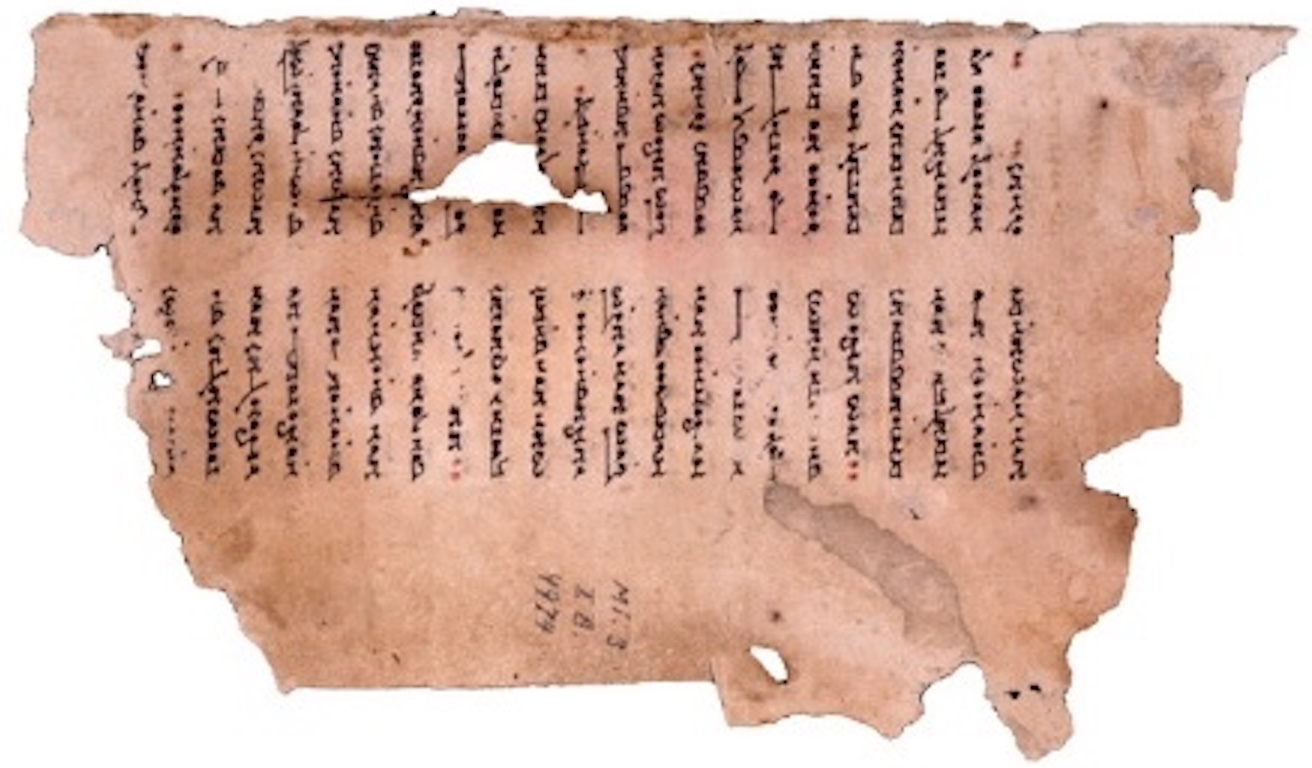
- Size: length 7.9 cm, width 15.5 cm
- Writing: Middle Persian written in Manichaean alphabet
- Created: 10th century
- Discovered: German Turpan expedition team in Xinjiang in the early 20th century Gaochang
- Present location: Museum of Asian Art, Germany
- Identification: MIK III 4974

Leaf from a Manichaean book MIK III 4974 is a fragment of Manichaean manuscripts collected in Germany Berlin Asian Art Museum, drawn in the 10th century, 20 At the beginning of the century, it was discovered by German Turpan expedition team in Xinjiang Gaochang Ancient City. The remaining page is 7.9 cm long and 15.5 cm wide, with an illuminated manuscript illustration drawn in the center of the front. The upper part of the book is written with Middle Persian Benediction The scriptures indicate that this fragment originally belonged to a Manichae Liturgical book.

== Image analysis ==
There is no decorative pattern on the back of the torn page, only two columns of verses are written vertically in black. On the left and right sides of the front, there are two columns with a total of 12 lines of scripture written in black. The four corners of the page are decorated with human figures and patterns. The most conspicuous middle position is occupied by a large illustration.

Hungary Asian religious art historian Aurel Stein named the illustrations "The Fruit of the Religion" (Work of the Religion) and "Light Redemption with the Hand of God" (Salvation of the Light with God's Hand), because this picture illustrates the core of Manichaeism Soteirology-saving the light body from the dark matter that imprisons it. In the picture, two laymen (listeners) can be seen kneeling on the red-edged green carpet, embracing the gold-encrusted classics. A three-foot gold plate placed in front of them was filled with fresh fruits and vegetables, which was a vegetarian diet offered by lay believers for the elect (priests). The two large kneeling figures on the left side of the screen are the voters of Manichaeism. They wear white crowns and white robes. These are typical Manichae costumes. Because Manichaeism believes that plants contain more light factors than animals, believers only choose vegetarian food such as fruit and pastries. After eating melons and fruits, the electorate's body will release the light, which means that the light factor can be freed again. Accompanied by the singing of hymns and chants, the light factor released from the electors embarked on a journey back to the kingdom of light. On the upper right side of the screen, there is a golden crescent moon and sun wheel pattern, where the sun and the moon are used as containers (ships) to carry the light factor and return to the kingdom of the Supreme God Mingzun. The right hand stretched out at the top right of the screen symbolizes Mingzun’s presence, and the art form of "Hand of God (art)" presents Mingzun's introduction The scene of the Sun Moon Ship full of light factors. There is a wealth of content in the Manichae literature to describe the theme of "the fruits of faith", which is good proof of the doctrinal connotation conveyed by this picture.

This illustration from Gaochang, Xinjiang is completely unaffected by the local culture and preserves the art traditions of West Asia intact. For example, this picture does not use material components such as Uighur costumes, furniture of Central Plains culture style, and other indoor furnishings that often appear in other Manichae arts, or Western Buddhist art images such as lotus flowers and mandalas. Therefore, the style of this illustration should be in the same line as the image style drawn by the leader Mani in Mesopotamia during the Sassanid era; there are no Buddhist elements in it, and the "hand of god" is more general. A unique form of artistic expression in Western culture (West Asia, North Africa, Europe) To sum up, this illustration is likely to be directly derived from the Manichae "Book of Pictures" and "Da Erzong Tu" painted by Mani himself. In other words, the picture should be Mani It teaches the purest essence of the West Asian art style that has not been infiltrated and influenced by other cultures during its inception.

== See ==
- Fragment of Manichae Manuscript
- Sgd Manichean Letters
