= Leaf from a Manichaean book MIK III 6368 =

Illuminated Chinese manuscript

Fragment of Manichae Manuscript MIK III 6368
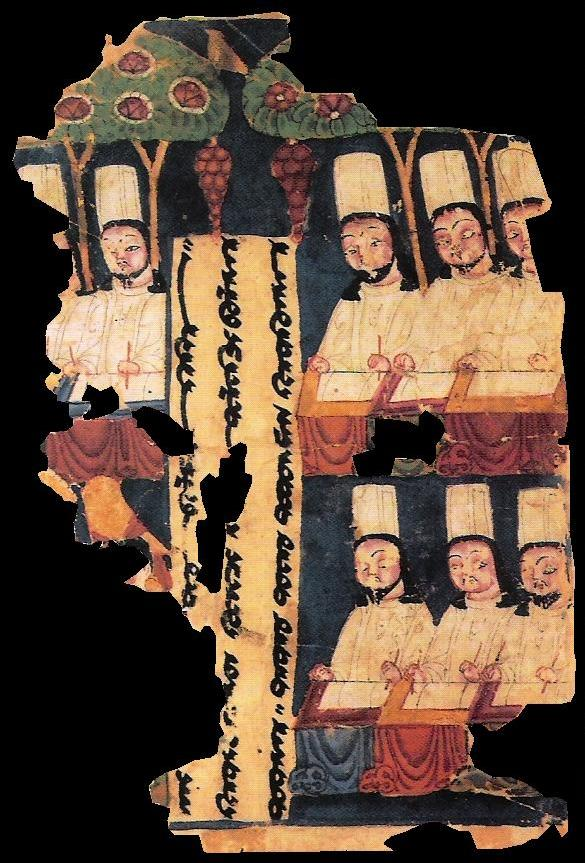
- The top image: the front of the torn page; the bottom image: the back of the torn page

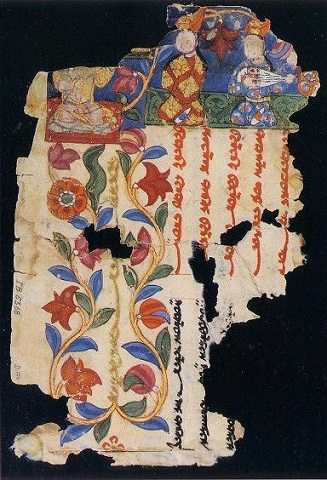
- Size: 17.2 cm in length and 11.2 cm in width
- Writing: Sogdian
- Created: 8-9th century
- Discovered: German Turpan expedition team at the beginning of the 20th century in Xinjiang Gaochang ruins
- Present location: Berlin Asian Art Museum, Germany
- Identification: MIK III 6368

Leaf from a Manichaean book MIK III 6368 is a fragment of Manichaean manuscripts collected in Germany Berlin Asian Art Museum, drawn during the 8th-9th centuries, Was discovered in Xinjiang by German Turpan expedition team in the early 20th century. The remaining page is 8.2 cm long and 11.0 cm wide, with slender painting illustrations on both sides, and the text is Sogdian.

== Description ==
=== front ===
The front illustration of the fragmented page is divided into two parts by the Sogdian text written in the vertical row in the middle, depicting two rows of Manichae priests or monks wearing white crowns and white robes. They have thick and carefully repaired beards. The long black hair covered the ears and spread to the shoulders; they were sitting in front of a writing desk covered in colorful cloth with paper on the desk. The priest held a pen in his hand and seemed to be writing scriptures or drawing illustrations. Behind the priest are two luxuriant trees. Not only are flowers blooming on them, but a golden bird can be seen standing by, and two bunches of full-fruited grapes hang from the tops of the trees. Blue is the background color of the entire illustration.

=== Back ===
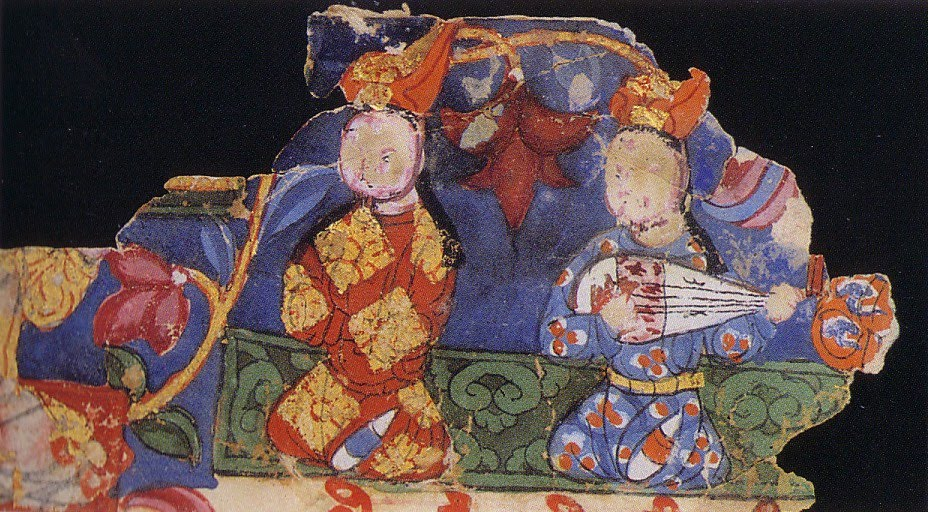
The Wiener player and the man in the worship ceremony are detailed on the back of the fragment.

The layout on the back of the broken page is completely different from the front. The text here is written on the right side of the page and divided into upper and lower parts. The upper part of the book is written in red and the lower part is written in black. The left side of the page is filled with a bright plant flower ornament. The title of this book is written in dark green text in the middle of the flower ornament-"The Four Princely Gods of Honor" (The Four Princely Gods); the left side of the flower ornament is in full bloom A five-petal flower, above the flowers can be seen a man in a white robe sitting cross-legged on a red carpet, his face and head are no longer visible due to the incomplete page. The illustration on the upper right originally depicted many musicians, but now there is only one Veena player wearing a blue robe and a gold belt. To the left of the musician is a man wearing a golden and red robe. He kneels on the green carpet, with his hands hidden in his sleeves on his chest as if he is performing a worship ceremony.

== See also ==
- Fragment of Manichae Manuscript
- Sgd Manichean Letters
