= Sealstone of Mani =

Manichaean relic

Mani's crystal seal
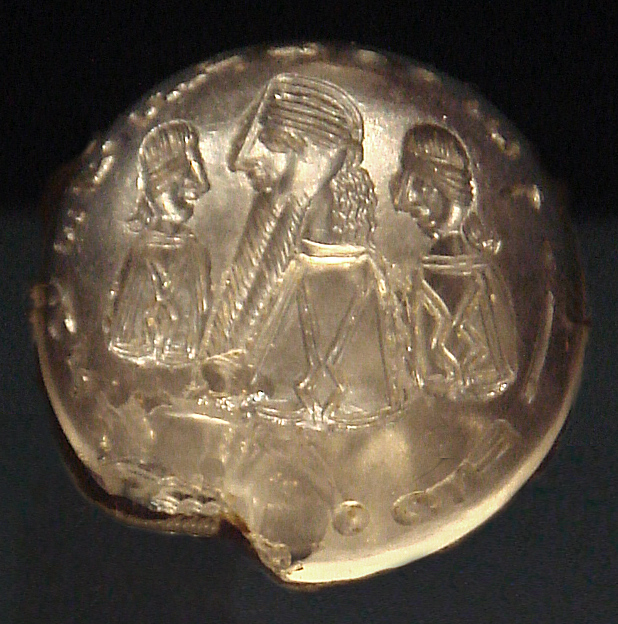
- The crystal seal seen from the perspective of the round convex surface
- Material: quartz
- Size: diameter 2.9 cm, thickness 0.9 cm
- Created: 3rd century AD
- Present location: National Library of France
- Identification: inv.58.1384bis
- Language: Syriac

The crystal seal of Mani (French: Sceau de Mani), also known as the crystal sealstone of Mani or the Manichean Rock-Crystal Seal, is a crystal stone seal with intaglio busts of three Manichean elect. There is a circle of Syriac writing around the intaglio, which could have been a personal seal used by Mani, the founder of Manichaeism. It is the oldest surviving piece of Manichaean art, and the only piece from Sassanid Mesopotamia. It is now in the collection of the National Library of France in Paris.

== Description ==
According to the research by Hungarian-born American Asian religious art historian Zsuzsanna Gulácsi, the seal was used between 240 and 274 or 277 AD. She believes that this crystal stone is a unique piece of art. Its uniqueness is not only because of its historical value, but also because of its artistic characteristics that are completely different from other ancient Iranian gem seals. This crystal was originally inlaid in a metal rim, and has two functions: first, its concave surface is used as a seal; second, the intaglio images and inscriptions seen through its round convex surface will appear as embossed. It can be worn as a gem-engraved necklace ornament.

The Syriac inscription engraved around its perimeter can be read through the transparent convex surface: "M’ny šlyḥ’ d-yyšw‘ mšyḥ’", meaning literally "Mani, messenger of Jesus messiah". The text may be interpreted as "Mani, the apostle of Jesus Christ", making this seal the first Manichaean artwork to mention Jesus. In early Manichaean literature, this sentence is often used as the beginning of the letters written by Mani.
