= Manichaean temple banner MIK III 6286 =

Manichaean monastery flag banner

Manichaeism painted banner MIK III 6286
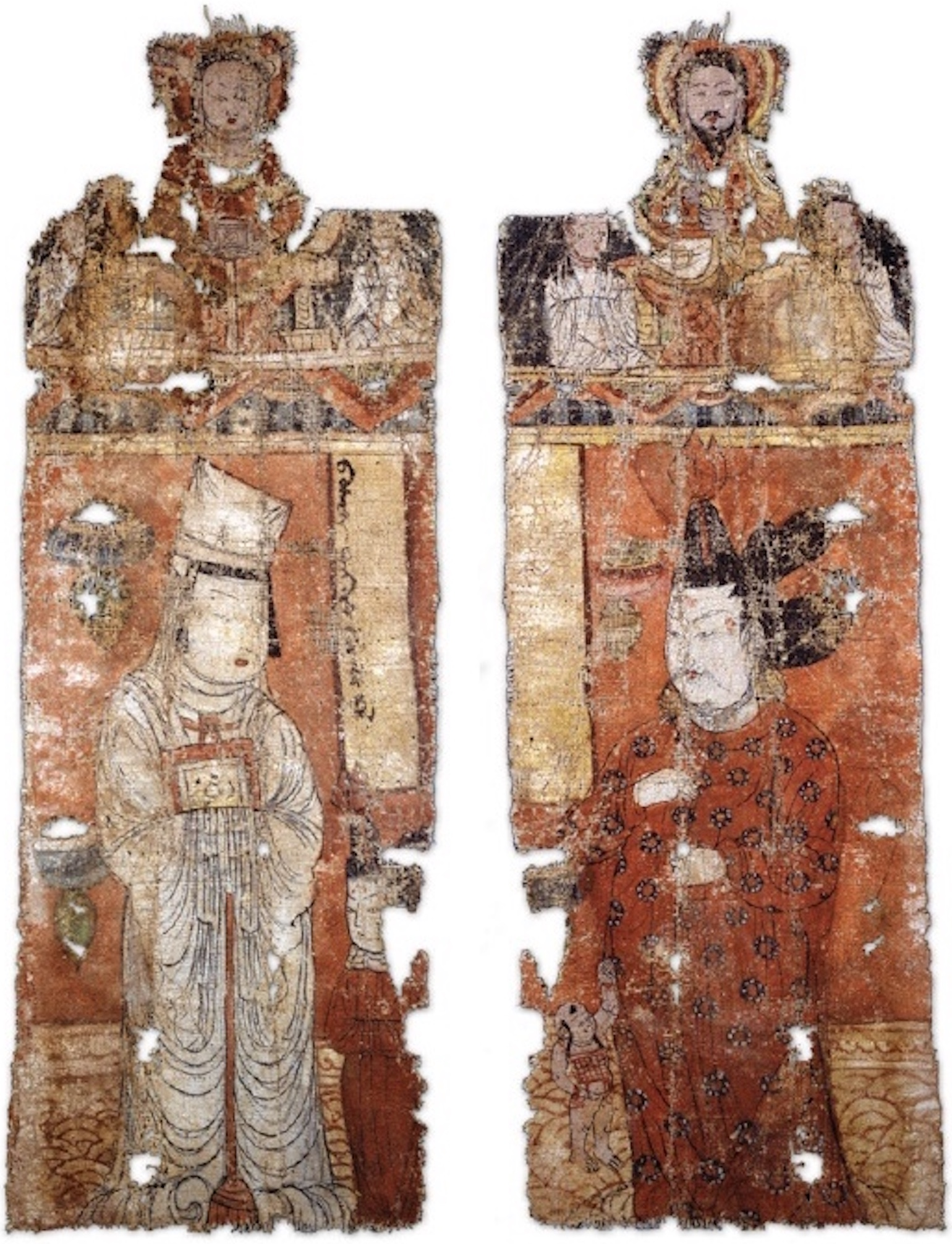
- Left: the front of the painted banner; right: the back of the painted banner
- Size: length 45.5 cm, width 16 cm
- Writing: Uighur written in Sogdian
- Created: 10th century
- Discovered: German Turpan expedition team in Xinjiang in the early 20th century Gaochang
- Present location: Berlin Asian Art Museum
- Identification: MIK III 6286

Manichaean Temple Banner Number "MIK Ⅲ 6286" is a Manichaean monastery flag banner collected in Berlin Asian Art Museum, made in the 10th century AD. It was found in Xinjiang Gaochang by a German Turpan expedition team at the beginning of the 20th century. The flag streamer is 45.5 cm long and 16 cm wide, with painted portraits on both sides. It is a funeral streamer dedicated to the deceased Manichae believers.

== Description ==
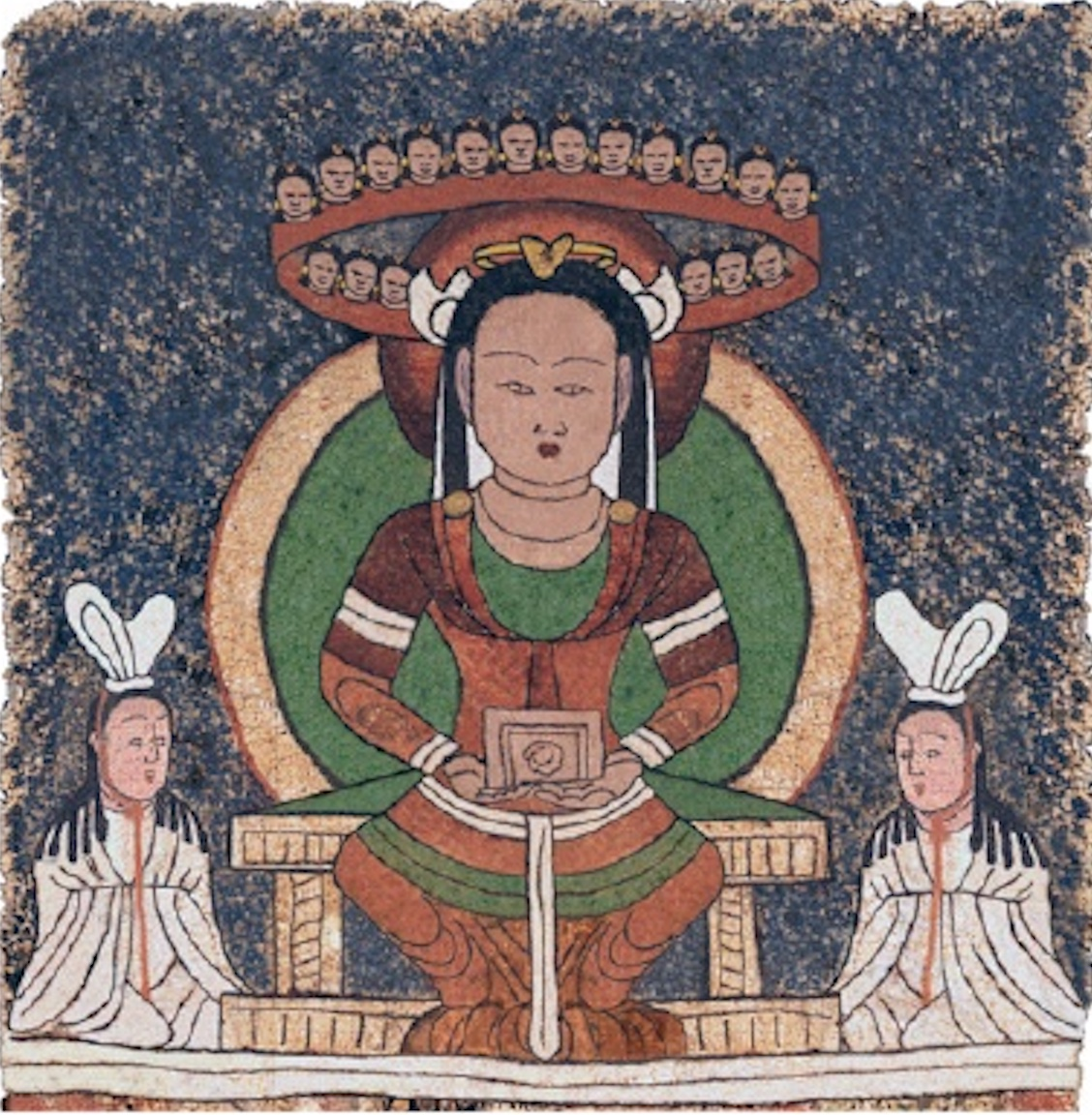
Digital restoration image of the seated Bright Maiden on the upper front

The picture on the flag banner is divided into upper and lower layers, and the upper layer image area is about one-half of the lower layer. On the lower front, there is a portrait of a Manichean female believer standing on a felt carpet. She embraces a book inlaid with gold, is dressed in a white robe, a white headscarf and a white top hat, which shows that she is an elector. There are two huge lotus buds floating on the left of the voters. On the upper right side is a frame similar to the circle of ancient Egyptian kings. Inside the frame is a Uighur written in Sogdian alphabet: "Portrait of Princess Busuš". Below the frame is a portrait of a female layman in a crimson robe, one-half the size of the voter's portrait. On the upper floor is painted a seated female god with a white crown and white robe sitting on each side; the golden ring-shaped crown of the god is decorated with the symbol of light, and a circle of small heads wearing the same symbol of light is suspended above the head. It depicts the Light Maiden. Originally depicted on the back was a portrait of a Manichean male voter, who was later repainted as a female layman, but the male voter's white crown and two moustaches on his lips are still faintly visible. This layman also stood on the felt carpet, wearing a crimson robe with black floral ornaments. She combed three large buns on her hair, a bun on the top of her head, two buns on the back of her head, and a floral ornament on the bun on top of her head. A lotus flower bud floats near the face on the left side, and a child raising his left hand is on the lower left side. On the upper floor is painted a sitting statue of a male god, with a slightly smaller voter sitting on each side, kneeling on each side. According to the description on the flag banner, this image is a statue of Jesus (Manichean translation "Yi Shu").

== Analysis ==
The image on the flag banner is related to the Manichaeism Salvation Theory, the salvation of the light, in which the light body/light element releases from the dark substances that imprison it, such as the flesh, and then returns to the kingdom of light. The two figures depicted on the banner—the voters and the laity—are portraits of two Manichaeans who have died. Because of their devotion to faith and observance of the canon, their bodies are full of light. The floating lotus buds around them have two meanings. One is to symbolize their "righteous" status; the other is to express the release of light molecules from the body. The small figures below should be living believers who pray for them. The statues of the Virgin of Light and Jesus on the upper level have the characteristics of the portraits of the Sasanian kings or gods of Persia, showing "Uighur style in Manichean art"; They are "guide gods", helping the souls of devout believers to return to the kingdom of light. From Coptic, Sabbath, and Middle Persian Manichae literature, the Virgin of Light and Jesus are the two most important gods who lead the way.

== Christ the King ==
Statue of Christ the King

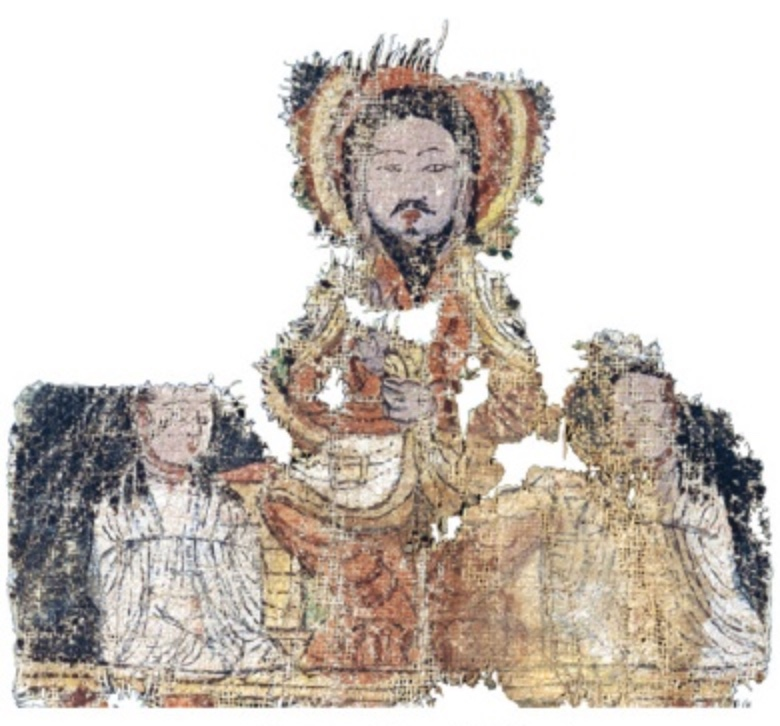
Original image, damaged

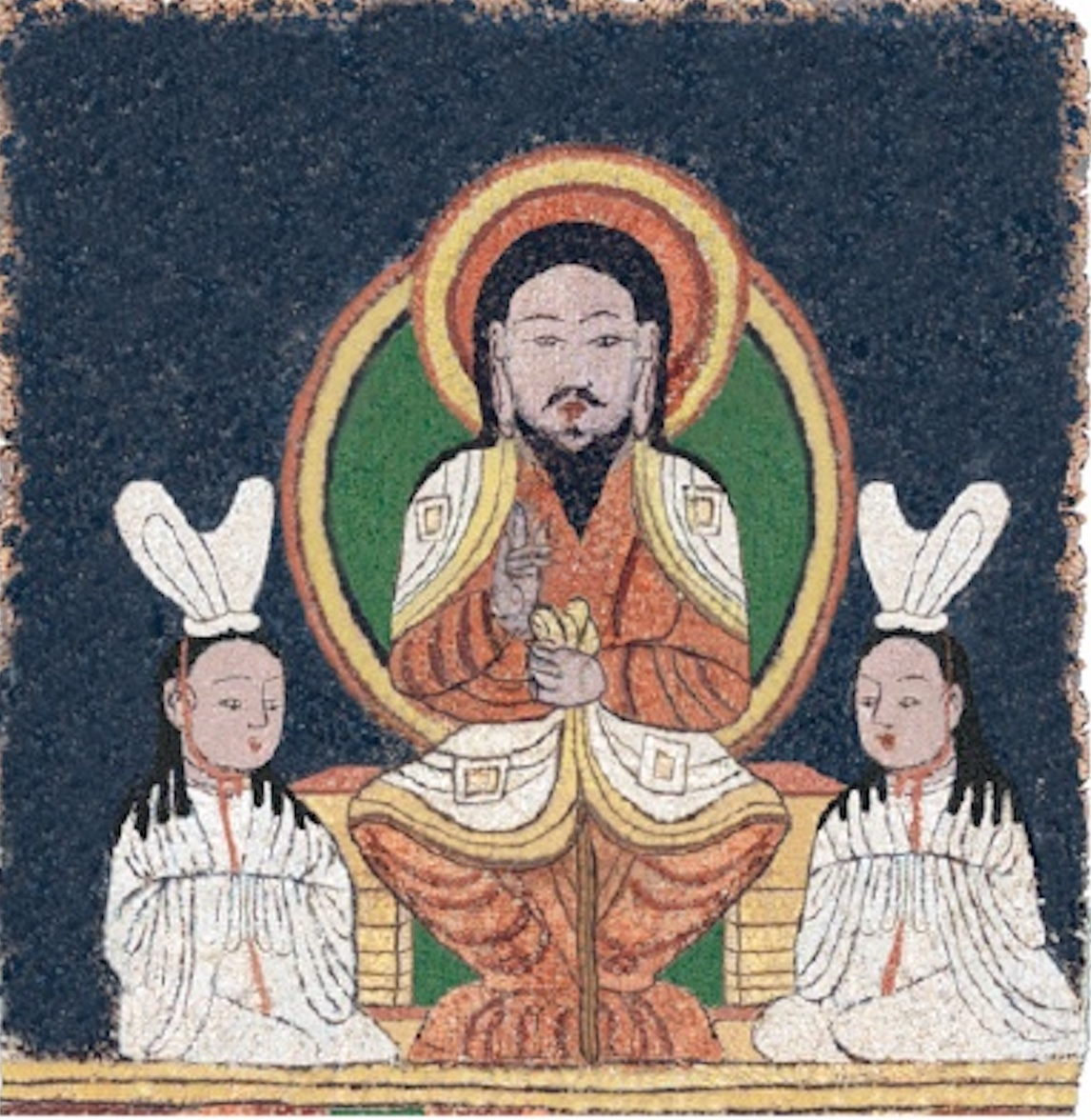
Digital recovery version

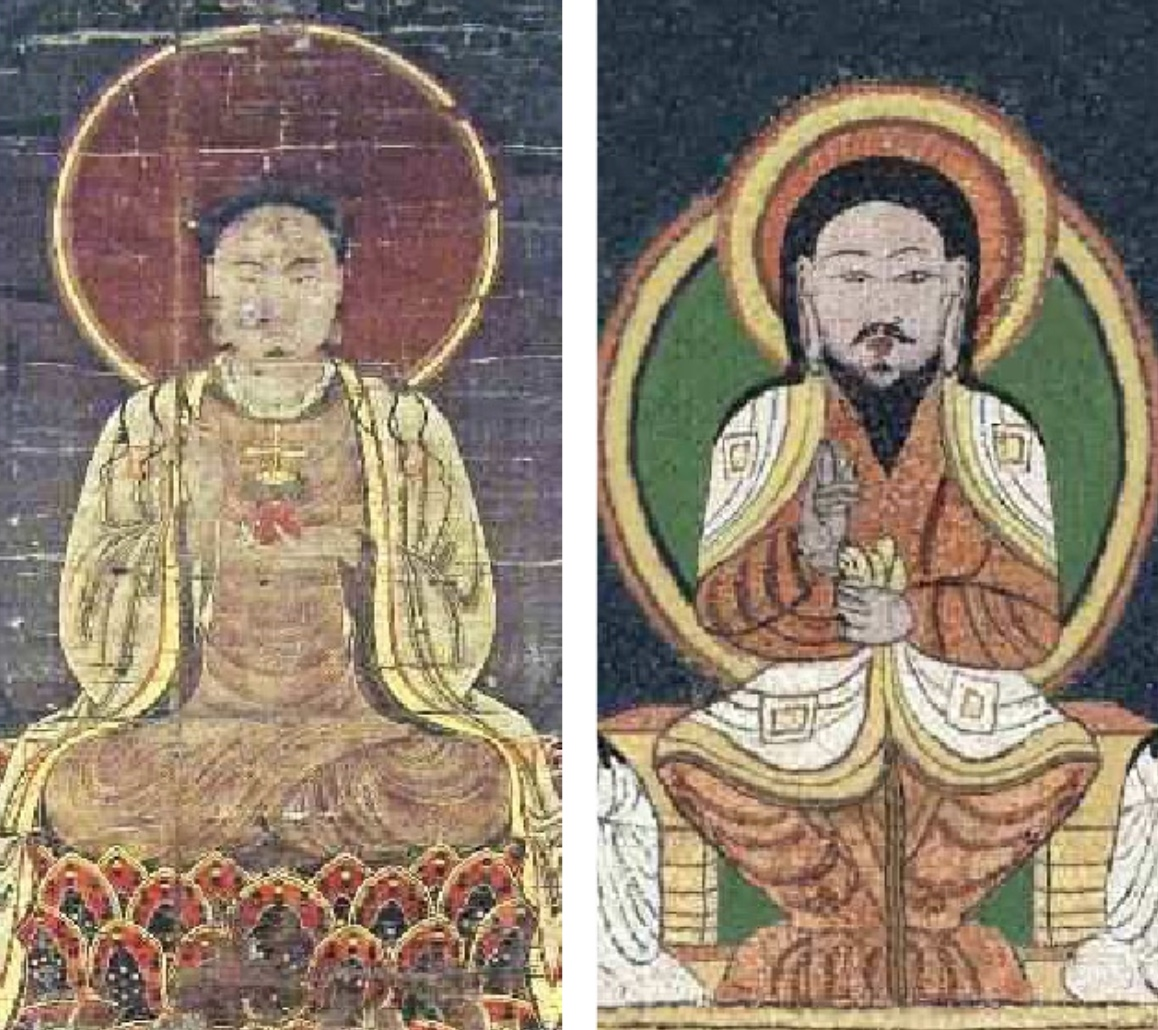
The comparison picture designed by Zsuzsanna Gulácsi, on the left is the Southern Song Dynasty "Yi Shu Buddha Frame". Similarities and differences: 1. Hair with red gilt rim; 2. Shawl, long hair, mustache and beard, neither of which wear headwear; 3. Four badges on the white robe with gilt rim; 4. All wear red robes; 5. The way of forming the seal of the right hand is the same; 6. The sitting posture and the seat (lotus platform, four-legged throne) are completely different due to cultural differences.

As mentioned above, the text on the flags indicates that the identity of the male god in the back picture is Jesus, which is translated as "Yi Shu" in Chinese by Manichaeism. The Yishu in the painting sits on a four-legged stool-like throne, wearing a red robe, and a white robe with gold edging. There are four badges on the white robe. The badges are small squares drawn with double lines. Box, leave blank inside the box. He has a seal on his right hand, the middle two fingers are closed with his thumb, and his left hand holds the hem of the white robe stacked on the knees. His long black hair is draped over his shoulders, and he has a triangular beard. He has a red gold-rimmed headlight and a large green gold-rimmed backlight behind him; Yi Shu like a voter with a white crown and white robe and long hair shawl sitting on each side. According to the characteristics of the image, this image can be called "the statue of the Christ the King", and it is the oldest known portrait of Jesus in Manichaeism.

Yishu is a deity of great importance in Manichaeism. Mani, the founder of the religion, grew up in a Christian Gnostic family in the 3rd century AD. His father Badi was a believer in the Elcesaites sect. They lived in southern Mesopotamia under the rule of the Sassanid dynasty. In addition to the Elcesaites, there were also other early Christian groups active there, such as the Badisan and the Magian, and Mani had contact with them. Although Mani mentions Zoroaster and Sakyamuni in his own writings, Jesus is the key point. For example: "Jesus is Mani's savior" ("Koeln Mani Scrolls"); "Muni, the Apostle of Jesus Christ" (Muni's crystal seal and his claim in the letter); "Muni is the Holy Spirit of Jesus" (the honorific name given to him by Mani's disciples). Augustine of Hippo once wrote about Manichaean obsession with Jesus, and there are many hymns in Manichae scriptures in various languages.

In summary, it can be seen that compared to Zoroastrianism, which originated from Persia, the relationship between Manichaeism and Christianity is actually deeper. After comparing several portraits of early Christian Jesus in the Mediterranean region, Hungarian Asian religious art historian Zsuzsanna Gulácsi found that two of them are particularly consistent with this image. One is a 6th-century inlay from St. Catherine's Monastery in Sinai, Egypt. The painting is located on the vault of the back hall of the monastery; the other is a mosaic on the dome of the Santa Pudenziana in Rome, painted in the fourth century. In addition, Gulácsi also compared this image with the Southern Song silk painting hanging scroll "Manichaean Painting of the Buddha Jesus", and found that this silk painting from the southern coastal area of China is also consistent with the Christ image. Although the cultural differences due to different locations make the two image art styles very different, their main elements are almost the same.

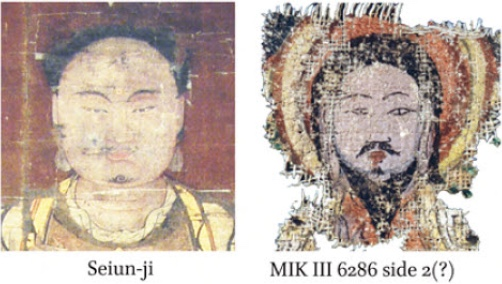
comparison of face

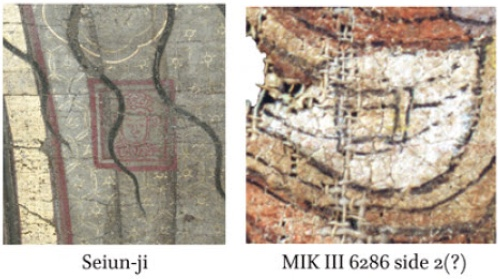
comparison of the Pei zhang (佩章)

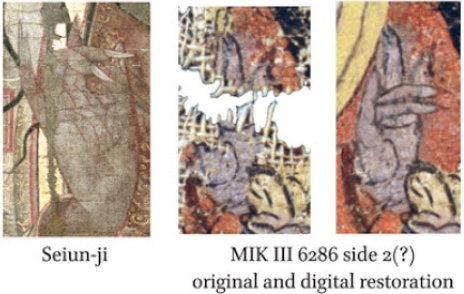
comparison of Mudra

== See also ==
- Fragment of Manichae Manuscript
- Sgd Manichean Letters
