= Leaf from a Manichaean book MIK III 8259 =

Manichaean Manuscript Fragment

Fragmented pages of Manichae manuscript MIK III 8259
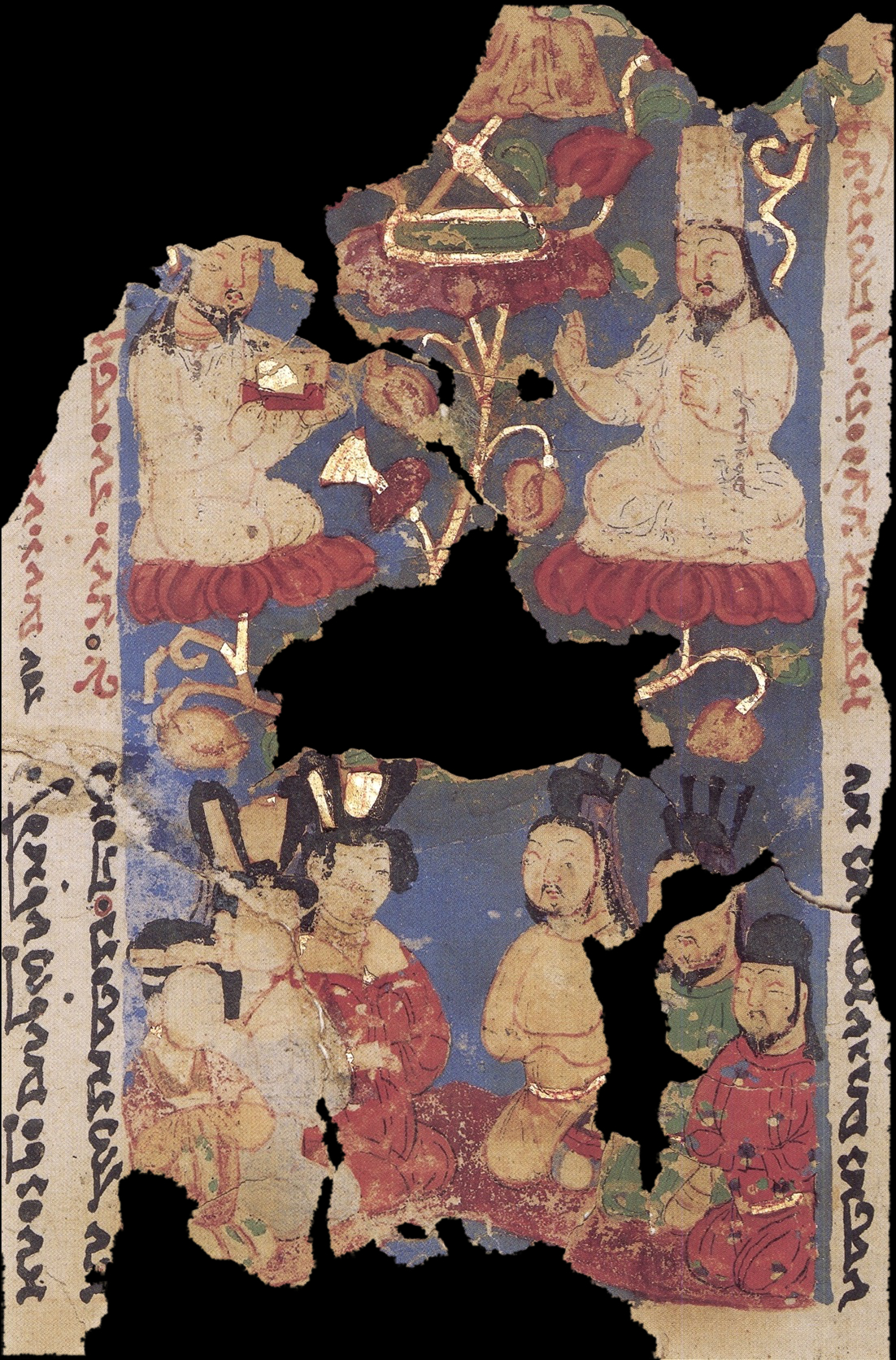
- Left: front; right: back
- Size: Length 8.2 cm, width 11.0 cm
- Created: 9–11th century
- Discovered: German Turpan expedition team at the beginning of the 20th century in Xinjiang Gaochang α ruins
- Present location: Berlin Asian Art Museum, Germany
- Identification: MIK III 8259

Leaf from a Manichaean book MIK III 8259 is a fragment of Manichaean manuscripts collected in Germany Berlin Asian Art Museum, drawn during the 8th–9th centuries. It was discovered in Xinjiang by German Turpan expedition team in the early 20th century. It is the largest currently known manuscript fragment, and is also the largest codex fragment with a figural scene, having a large portion of text on the same fragment. There is also text on the reverse of the image.

According to Zsuzsanna Gulácsi's interpretation of the fragment, following Albert von Le Coq, in the bottom segment three laymen and three laywomen of the Uyghur royal family are listening to a sermon, while in the upper section elects are giving a sermon.

Drawing attention to the depiction of a flower in the central part of the fragment, Samuel N. C. Lieu instead interprets the fragment as a visionary scene of penitence in the context of the Manichaean doctrine of the imprisonment of Light in living things: "The fear is so apparent on their [the elects'] faces that von Le Coq's original explanation for the miniature as a didactic scene is grossly inadequate. What we have before us are two Electi terrified at the sight of blood spurting from a damaged plant." At the bottom, "a group of Hearers (who might have been responsible for the crime) in penitential stance completes a doctrinally significant artistic representation."
