= Veneration of the Tree of Life =

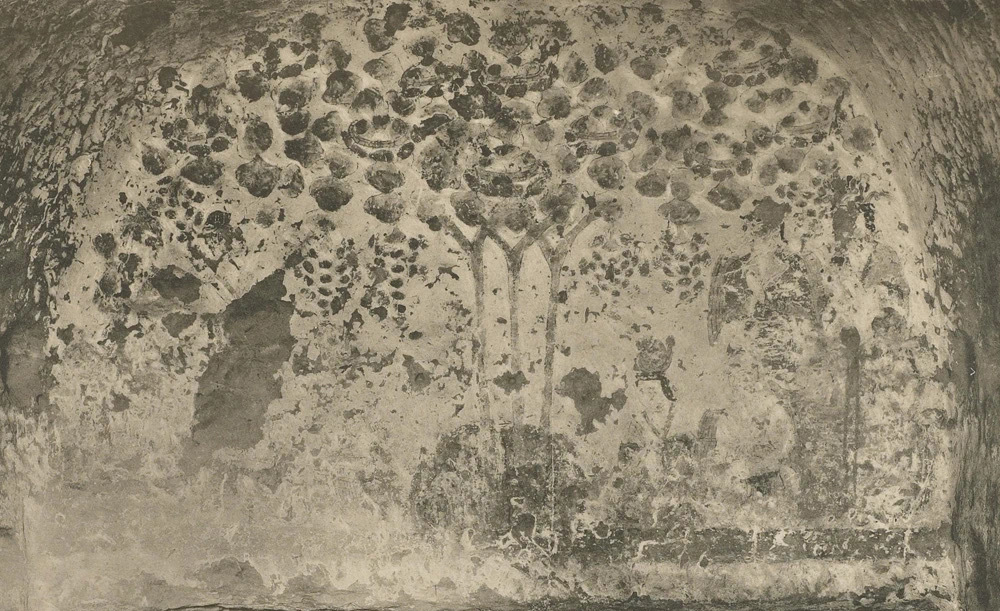
- Artist: Unknown
- Year: 9–11th century
- Type: Mural
- Dimensions: 180 cm × 280 cm (71 in × 110 in)
- Location: Bezeklik Thousand Buddha Caves; Turpan

The Veneration of the Tree of Life is a Manichaean fresco in Cave 38 (No. 25 according to Grünwedel) of the Bezeklik Caves in Turpan, Xinjiang, China, that depicts a Manichaean tree of life worship scene. According to the teachings of this religion, there is a tree of life growing in the Kingdom of Light. It has three trunks, which symbolize the East, West, and North of the Kingdom of Light.

== Overview ==
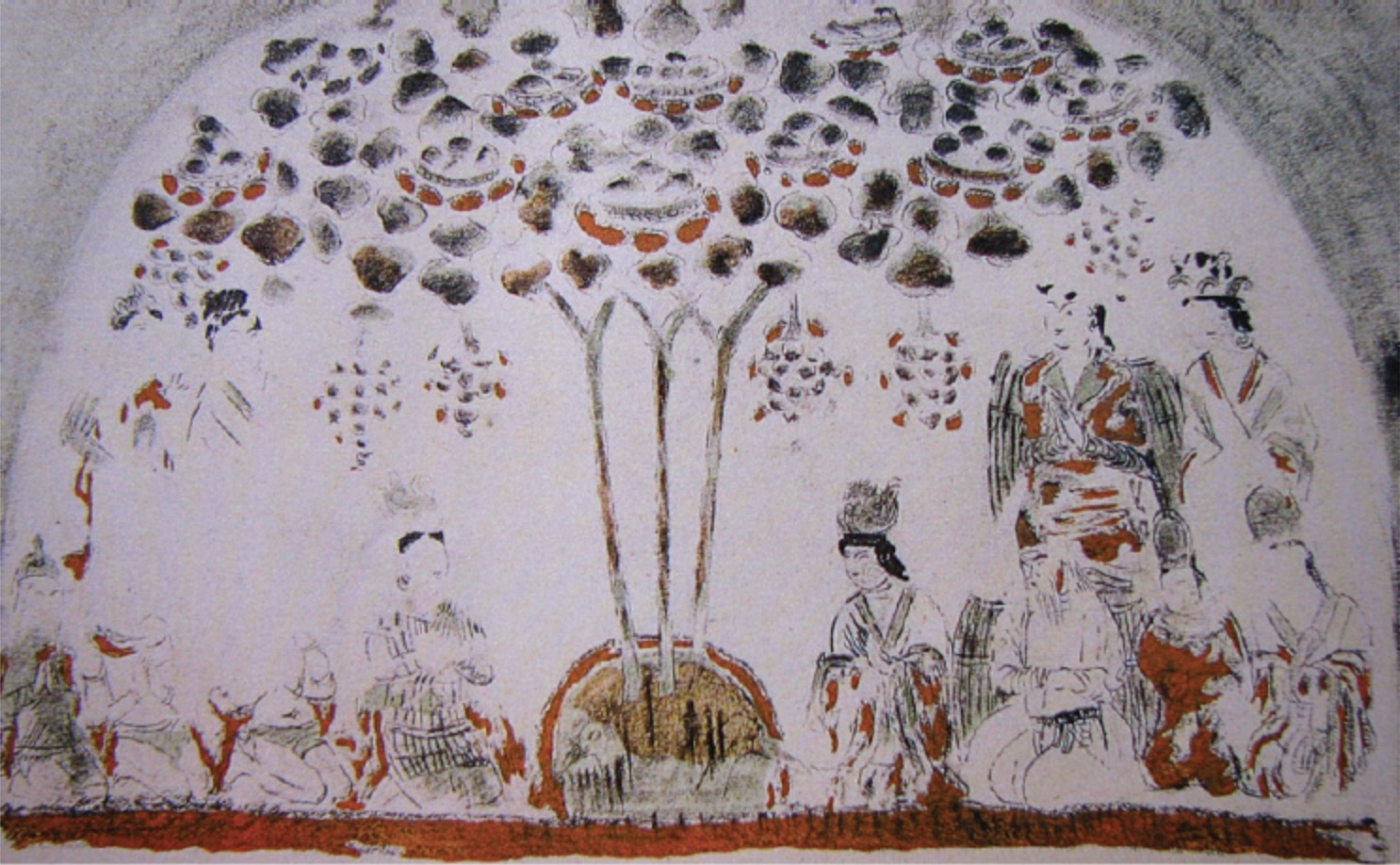
Sketch copy by Joseph Hackin

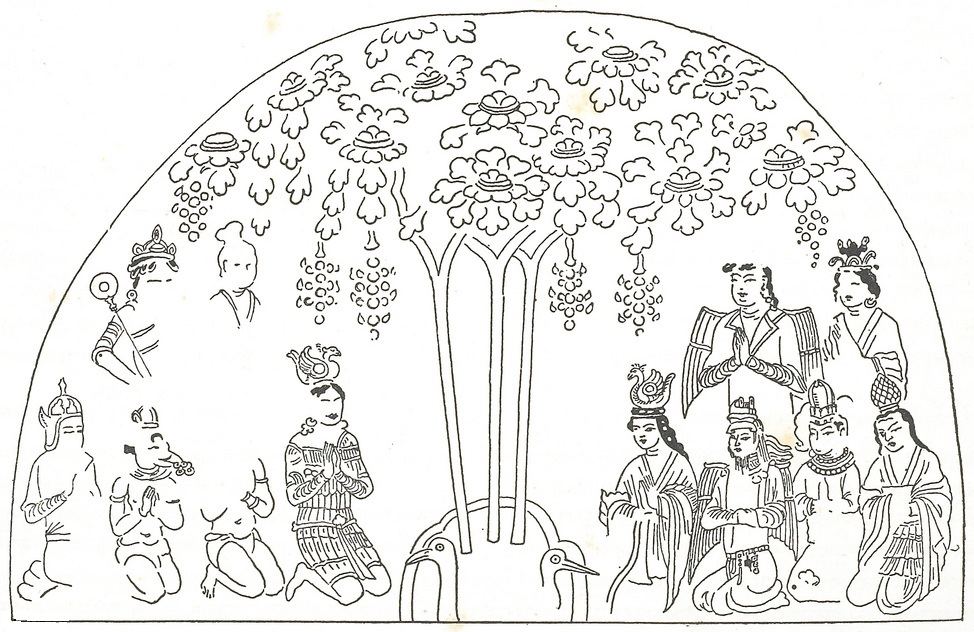
Krenweidel's line drawing

This fresco was discovered in the early 20th century and was already badly damaged. In order to facilitate research, the German archaeologist Albert Grünwedel drew a black-and-white line sketch, followed by the French archaeologist Joseph Hackin copied color pictures.

The center of the picture depicts a tree of life with three trunks. The tree has luxuriant branches and leaves, fragrant flowers in full bloom, and numerous fruits. There are huge bunches of grapes hanging down from the branches. The whole tree looks like a huge canopy. The pool under the tree may be the "Scented Pond of the Seven Treasures", with two birds in the pool looking at the worshiping crowd. On the left and right sides of the trunk, there were six people saluting the tree of life. Four of them were kneeling in the front and two standing in the back. They are well-dressed and wear richly decorated high crowns. Among them are angels with wings, believers, and other gods. The angel's name, praise, and vows are Uighur, written in the pool and in the sidebar under the painting.

Below the incense pond, there is a Uyghur script written in Uighur letters in vertical lines, similar to the prayers: "This is a gathering of guardian deities", "With(?) the image of the peacock. I, Sävit, have written. May there be no sin. [...] May [...] be protected", "Ötükän Ngošakanč (and) Qutluk Tapmïš Qy-a may they be protected... I have humbly done [...] may be at peace. Please forgive my sins.” Although some of the contents of the prayers involve frescoes, these words are not left by the original author.

== See also ==
- Sogdian-language Manichaean letter
