= Sogdian-language Manichaean letter =

Manichaean manuscript

Sogdian Manichean Letters
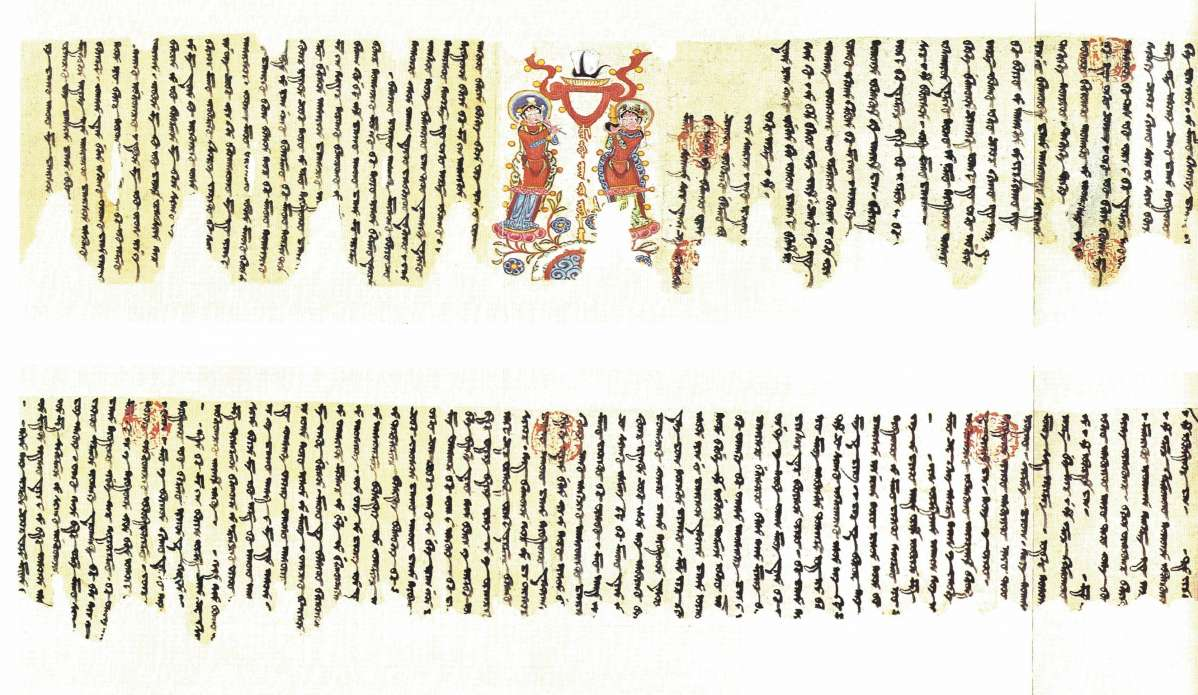
- Material: paper
- Size: 268 × 26 cm
- Writing: Sogdian
- Created: 9-13th century
- Discovered: Bezeklik Caves Cave 65 in 1981
- Present location: Xinjiang Turpan Museum
- Identification: 81 TB 65:01

The Sogdian-language Manichaean letter is a Sogdian letter written by Shahryâr Zâdag to Mu Wei (bishop, leader) of the Eastern Diocese, found in Xinjiang Baziklik Thousand-Buddha Caves, selected National Precious Ancient Books. This item is now in the collection of the Turpan Museum (item no. 81 TB 65:01).

== Introduction ==
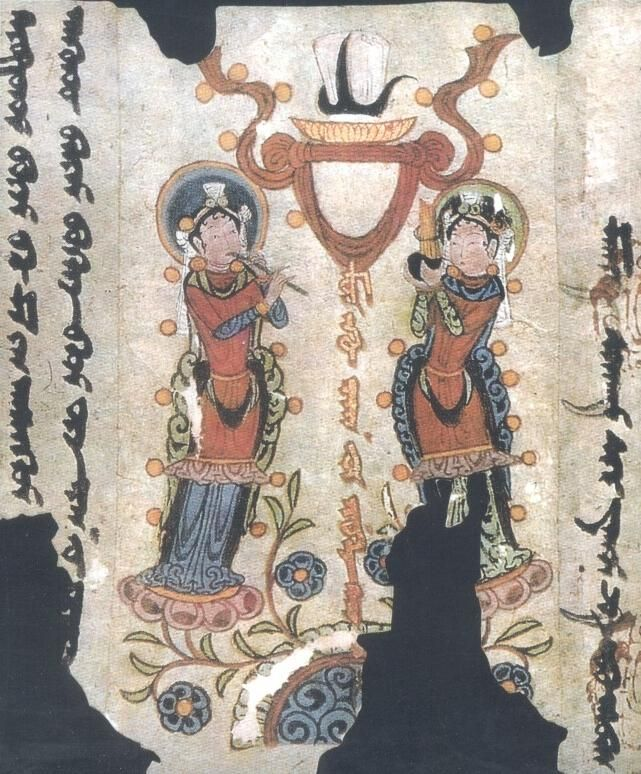
illustration of the god of music

In the summer of 1981, local archaeologists in Xinjiang were on a stupa when the sand and soil collapsed in Cave No. 65 of the Baziklik Thousand-Buddha Caves in the summer of 1981.

The letter is composed of nine pieces of paper glued together, all written in Sogdian. There is a vermilion seal on the paper adhesion and the bottom line, and there is an illustration in the middle of the upper line, depicting a pair of beautifully dressed figures wearing a scarf and crown, one blue and one green halo. Between the gods of music and music, there is a Sogdian "Glory of Mucha" with gold leaf which has become the most eye-catching and unique symbol of the letter.

Above the golden halo is a white hat crown exclusively for the Elect. The crown is placed on a gold plate, which is placed on a red shawl floating in the air. There is a circular pool below the title, in which the fragrant flowers are in full bloom, and the flower core just holds up the two gods.The illustration is still brightly colored, and the entire letter glows with gorgeous colors of red, blue, gold, green, and purple.

According to the Japanese linguist Yutaka Yoshida, two of the letters were written to a bishop and one is greetings and religious expressions aimed at the Manichaean lay community.

== See also ==
- Veneration of the Tree of Life
- Manichaean art#Illuminated Manuscripts
- Dunhuang Manichaean texts
- Manichaean temple banner MIK III 6286
