= Icon of Mani =

Silk painting hanging scroll

Statue of Mani
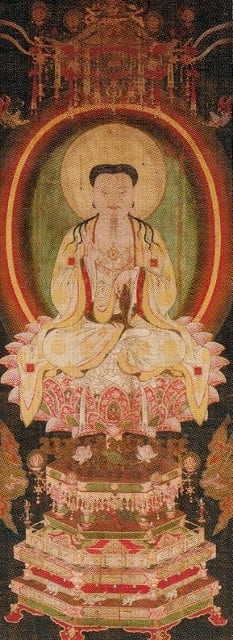
- Artist: Unknown
- Year: 14-15th century (late Yuan and early Ming)
- Type: Silk painting hanging scroll
- Dimensions: 183.3 cm × 67.5 cm (72.2 in × 26.6 in)
- Location: Fujita Art Museum; Osaka City

Icon of Mani (Japanese: マニ像; Icon of Mani) is a silk painting hanging scroll from the Yuan or Ming period, from the coastal area of southern China, depicting Mani. The portrait of the founder Mani has been completely Sinicized.

== Discovery process ==
The black and white photo of this painting was originally published in the 1937 Japanese Oriental Art Periodical "Guo Hua", but did not give the location of the collection and other relevant information. According to the research of Hungarian Asian religious art historian Zsuzsanna Gulácsi, the painting has similar features to the Mani statue depicted in the "Sermon on Mani's Teaching of Salvation". It should be an icon used by Manichae in southern China for religious worship. Originally it was not possible to verify the source, so it is generally believed that it was lost during World War II. However, the documentary linguistics professor Yoshida of Kyoto University discovered the original work of "Icon of Mani" at the Fujita Museum of Art in Osaka, Japan in 2019. Later, the painting was exhibited at the "National Treasure No. Fujita Museum Exhibition" at the Nara National Museum. "On public display.

== Gallery ==
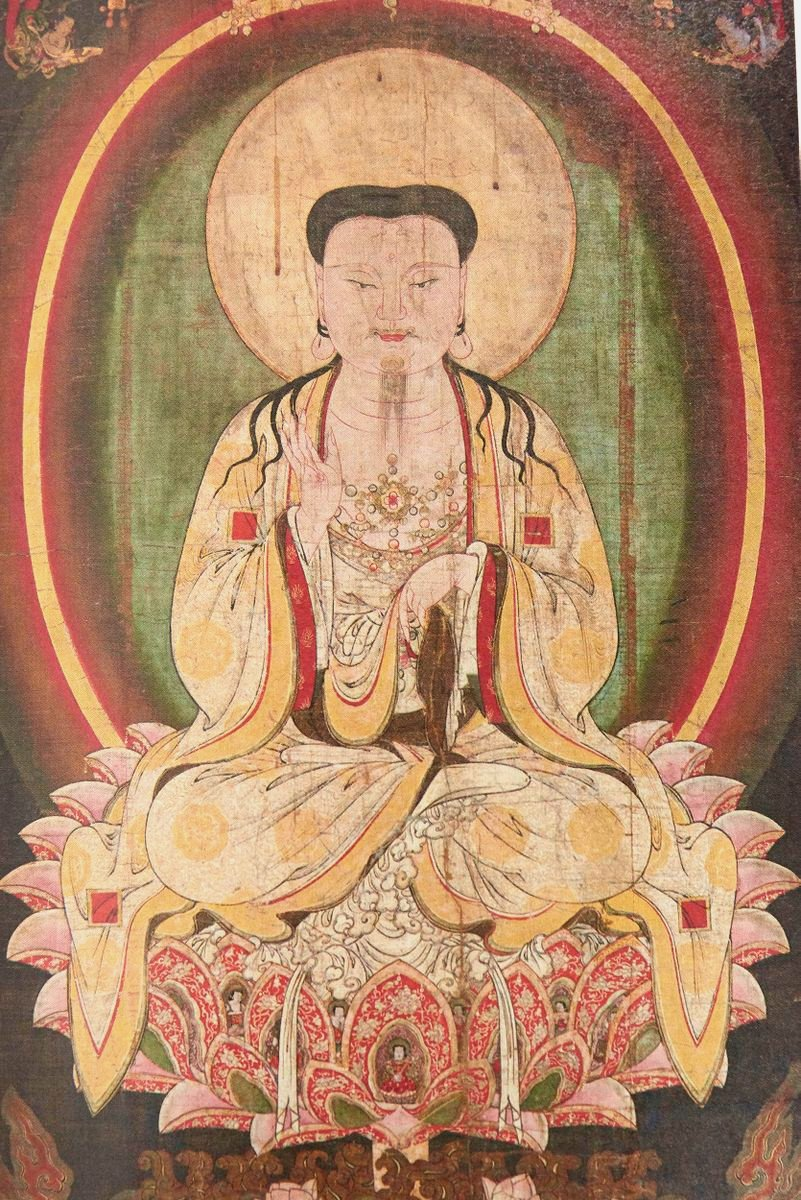
Details of the main image of the original painting

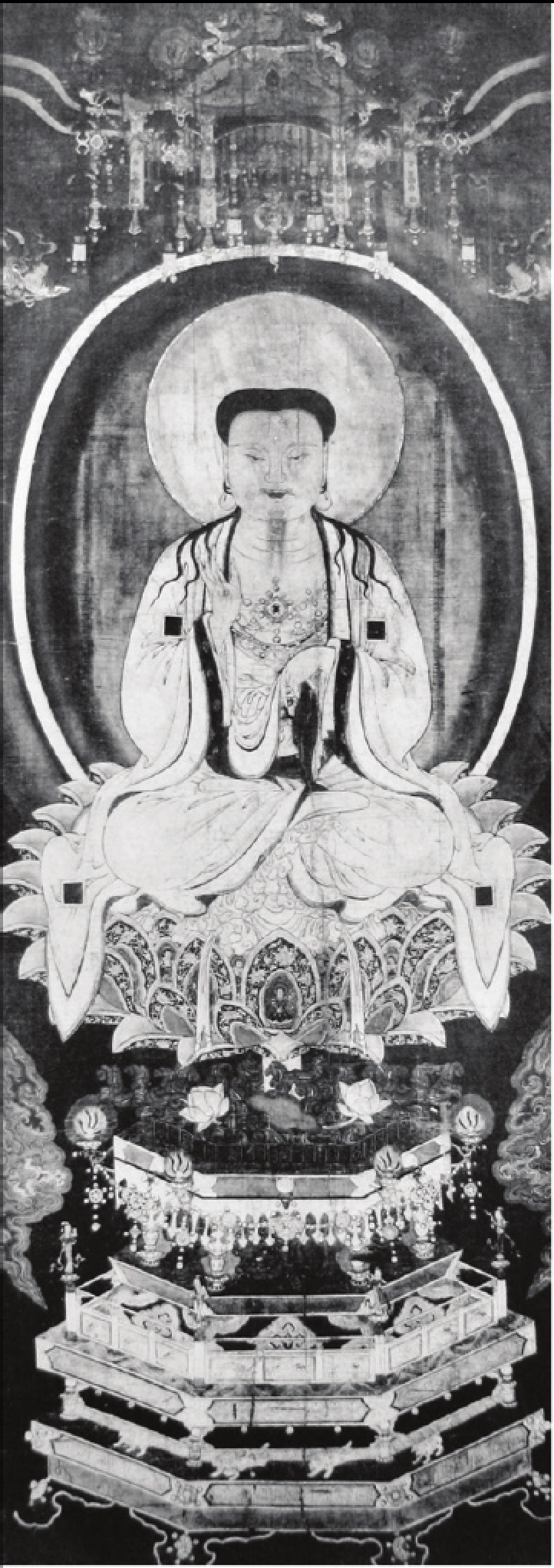
Black and white photos published on "Guo Hua"

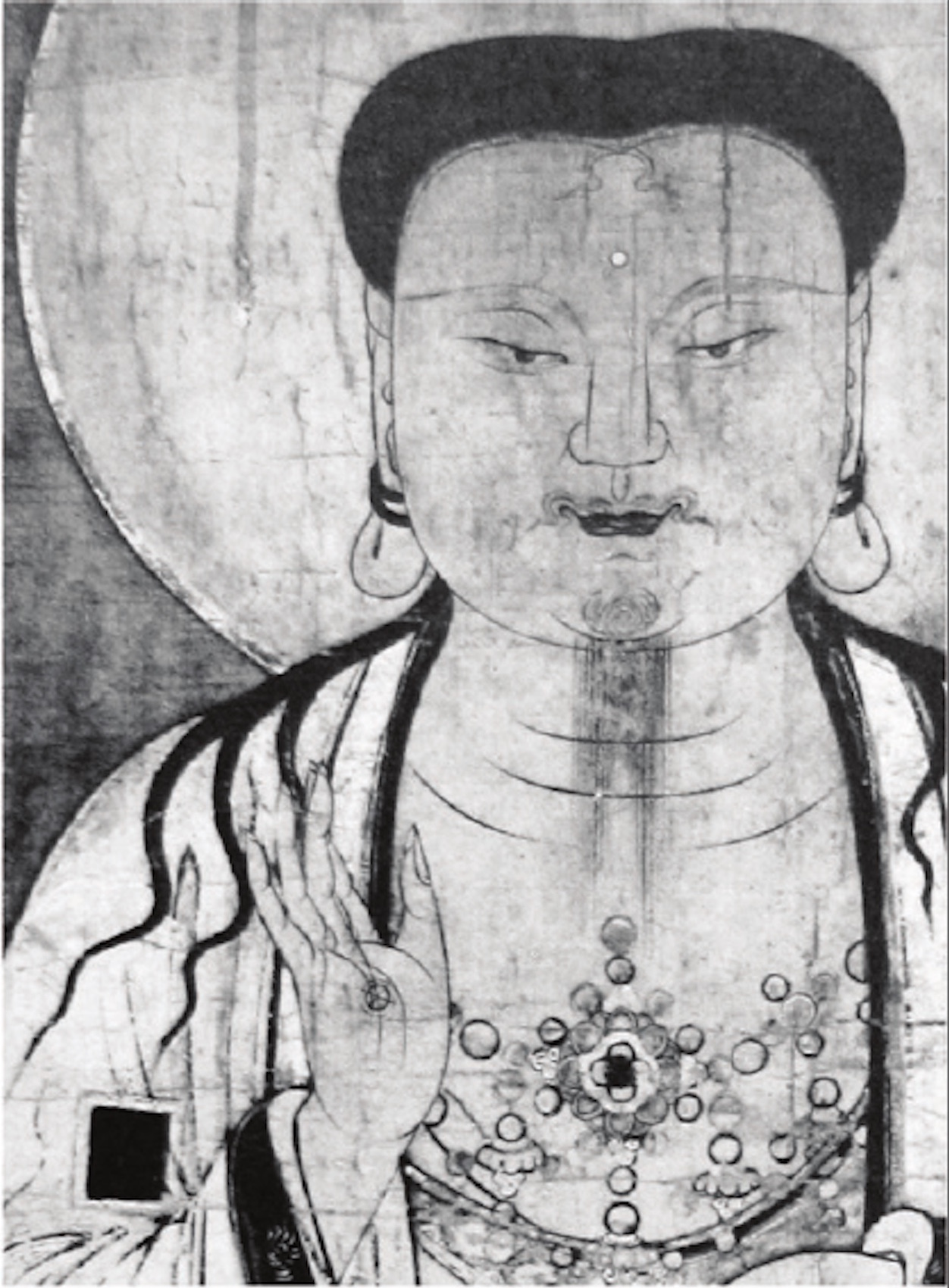
Details of the main image: the jewel ring worn on the chest, the black square pattern on the white robe

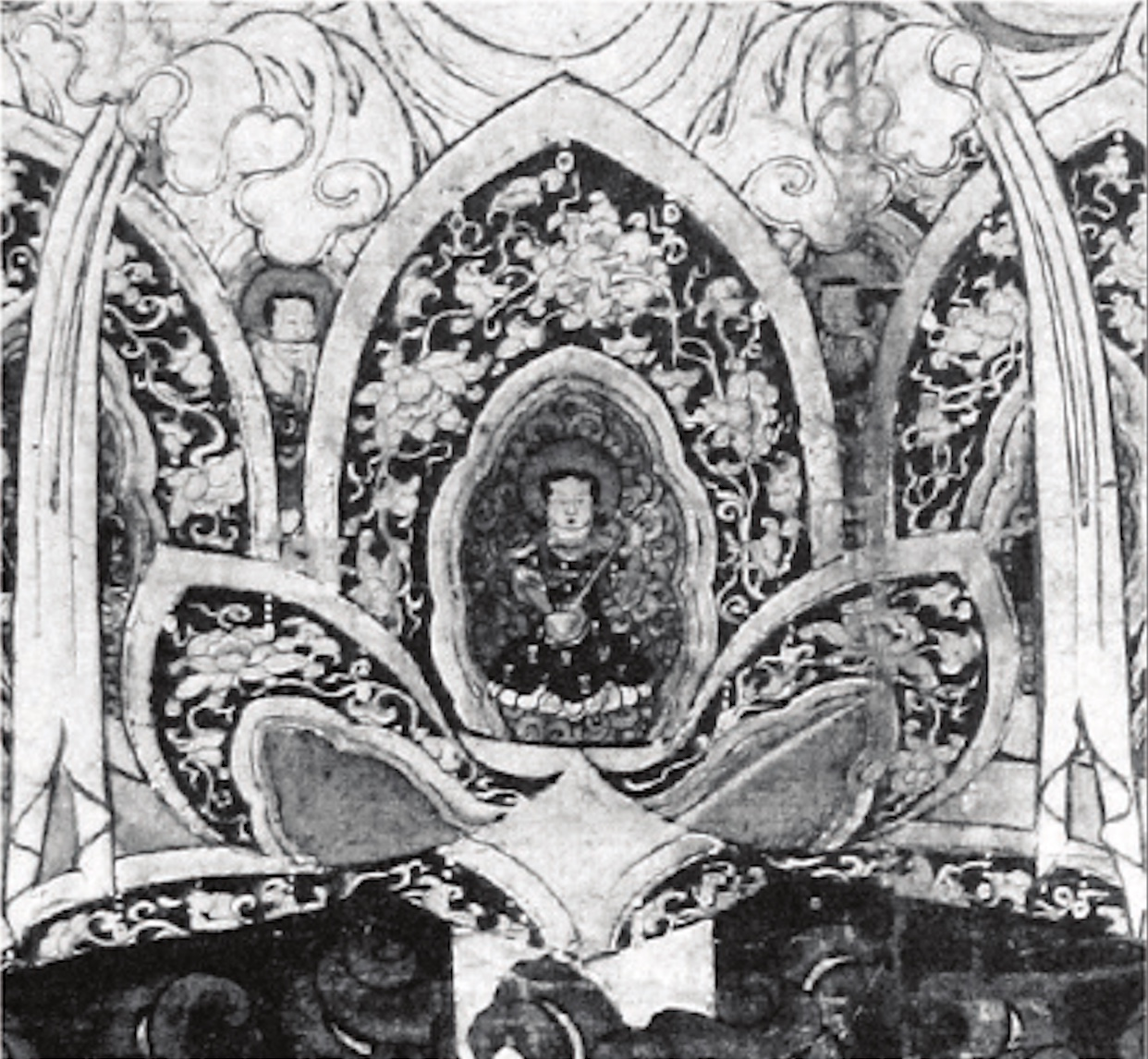
Lianhuatai details: the performance of the mani Lotte, it can be seen that his costume also has the style of Western Regions

Comparison with the "Buddha of Light" statue

The comparison chart made by Zsuzsanna Gulácsi compares the details of the painting with the Mani statue in "Icon of Mani" and the "Buddha of Light" statue of Mani in Cao'an in Quanzhou.

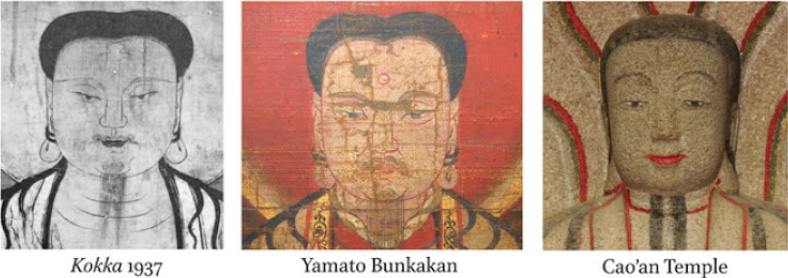

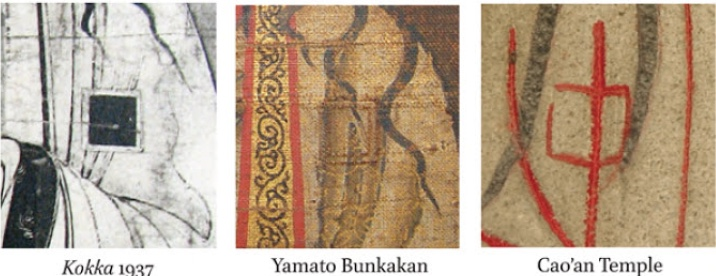

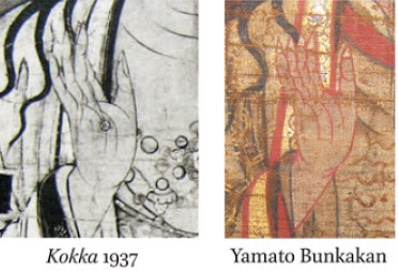

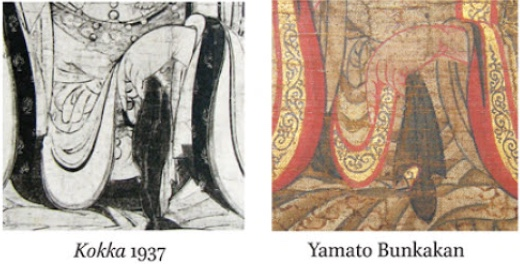

== Excursus ==
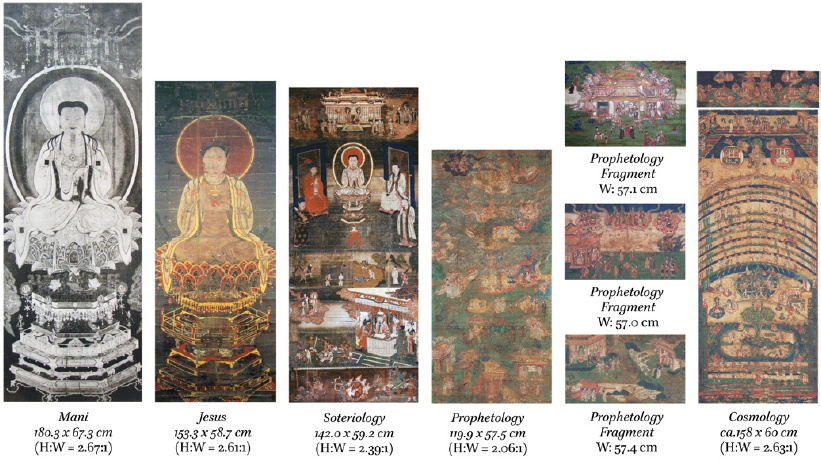
Eight Silk Painting Atlas

Eight silk hanging scrolls with Manichaean didactic images from southern China from between the 12th and the 15th centuries, which can be divided into four categories:

Two single portraits (depicting Mani and Jesus)

- Icon of Mani
- Manichaean Painting of the Buddha Jesus

One scroll depicting Salvation Theory (Soteriology)

- Sermon on Mani's Teaching of Salvation

Four scrolls depicting Prophetology (Prophetology)

- Mani's Parents
- Birth of Mani
- Episodes from Mani's Missionary Work
- Mani's Community Established

One scroll depicting Cosmology (Cosmology)

- Manichaean Diagram of the Universe
