= Mani's Parents =

Color painting on silk

- Mani's Parents (English)
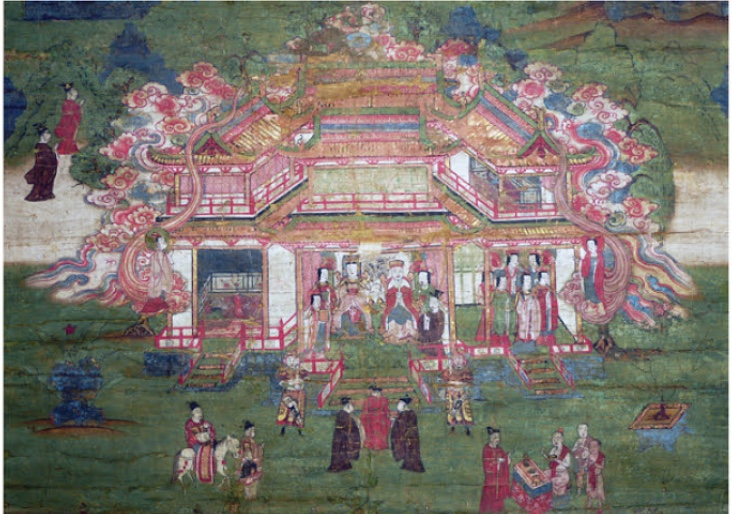
- Artist: Unknown
- Year: 14-15th century (late Yuan and early Ming)
- Type: Silk, ink and gold
- Dimensions: 39.7 cm × 57.1 cm (15.6 in × 22.5 in)
- Location: San Francisco Asian Art Museum; San Francisco

Mani's Parents is a color painting on silk drawn in the coastal areas of southern China during the late Yuan and early Ming dynasties. It is in the collection of the Asian Art Museum in San Francisco, California, and was donated by Ivory Brendage. The title given on the official website of the museum is "Fragment of a Manichaen Mandala".

After Miki Morita's research, especially after comparing it with The Birth of Mani, it is believed that the painting is a work of Manichaeism, depicting the image of the father and mother of Mani, the founder of the religion. Morita's research results were published in "Piecing a Picture Together: A New Manichaean Perspective on a Chinese Religious Painting in the Asian Art Museum of San Francisco", a view which was also adopted by the religious art historian Zsuzsanna Gulácsi in her work "Mani's Pictures". This painting was originally part of a large-scale Manichean silk painting. The drawing technique and artistic style are the same as those in "The Legend of the Holy One", The Birth of Mani and the "Manichae Universe".

== Brief analysis ==
Miki Morita identified this painting as Manichaean mainly by its artistic style: the woman sitting in the hall of the main hall is very similar to the image of Mani in The Birth of Mani, and the artistic style of this painting is almost identical to that of the birth picture, which shows that it depicts "how Mani was conceived". The first half of this account is a reference to the birth of a mani. The first half of this entry states that Man-yin's strict observance of the precepts of fasting and purification enabled her to conceive the saint Mani, which is the message the painting is supposed to convey. In addition, the painting lacks the important element of the white elephant entering the dream of the Māyāvādīs, which is usually depicted in the birth of the Buddha, indicating that it is not a Buddhist painting..

== Excursus ==
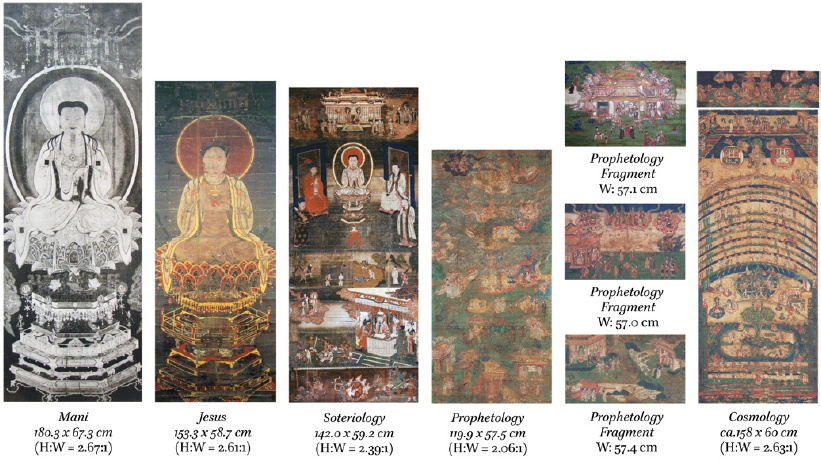
Eight Silk Painting Atlas

Eight silk hanging scrolls with Manichaean didactic images from southern China from between the 12th and the 15th centuries. They can be divided into four categories:

Two single portraits (depicting Mani and Jesus)

- Icon of Mani
- Manichaean Painting of the Buddha Jesus

One scroll depicting Salvation Theory (Soteriology)

- Sermon on Mani's Teaching of Salvation

Four scrolls depicting Prophetology (Prophetology)

- Mani's Parents
- Birth of Mani
- Episodes from Mani's Missionary Work
- Mani's Community Established

One scroll depicting Cosmology (Cosmology)

- Manichaean Diagram of the Universe
