= Episodes from Mani's Missionary Work =

Manichean silk color painting

Legend of the Saint 1
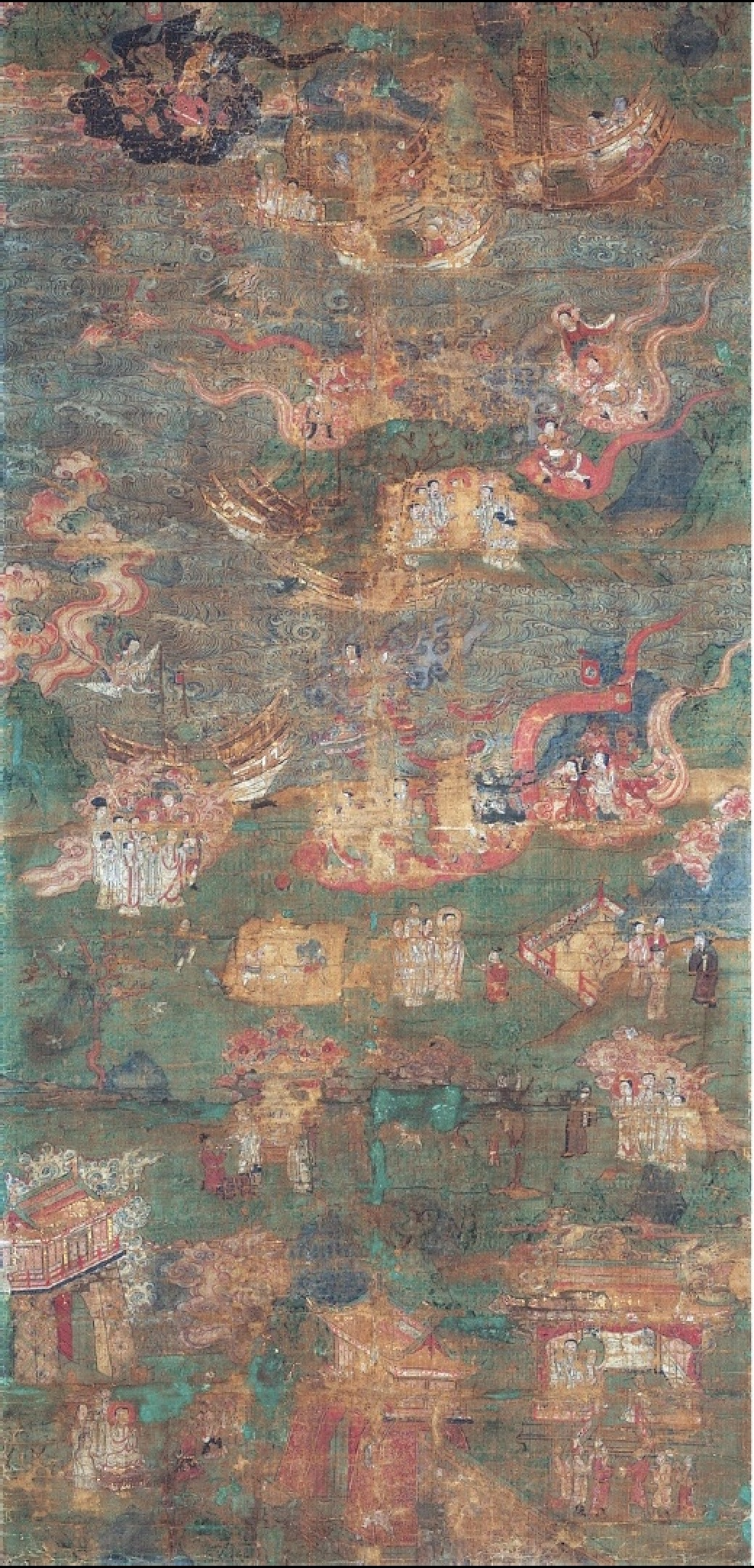
- Artist: unknown
- Year: 14-15th century (late Yuan and early Ming)
- Type: Silk, ink and gold
- Dimensions: 119.9 cm × 57.6 cm (47.2 in × 22.7 in)
- Location: private collection, Japan

Episodes from Mani's Missionary Work is a Manichean silk color painting drawn in the coastal area of southern China during the Yuan to Ming period. It is now in a private Japanese collection. The whole picture can be roughly divided into five scenes, depicting the missionary process of a Manichean elector. According to Hungarian Asian religious art historian Zsuzsanna Gulácsi, this priest is probably the founder of Manichaeism Mani himself. This painting was originally part of a large-scale Manichean silk painting. The drawing technique and artistic style are similar to Mani's Community Established, Mani's Parents, The Birth of Mani and Manichaean Diagram of the Universe.

In Japanese it is called Legend of the Saint 1 (圣者伝図1) with Mani's Community Established being called Legend of the Saint 2 (圣者伝図2)

== Description ==
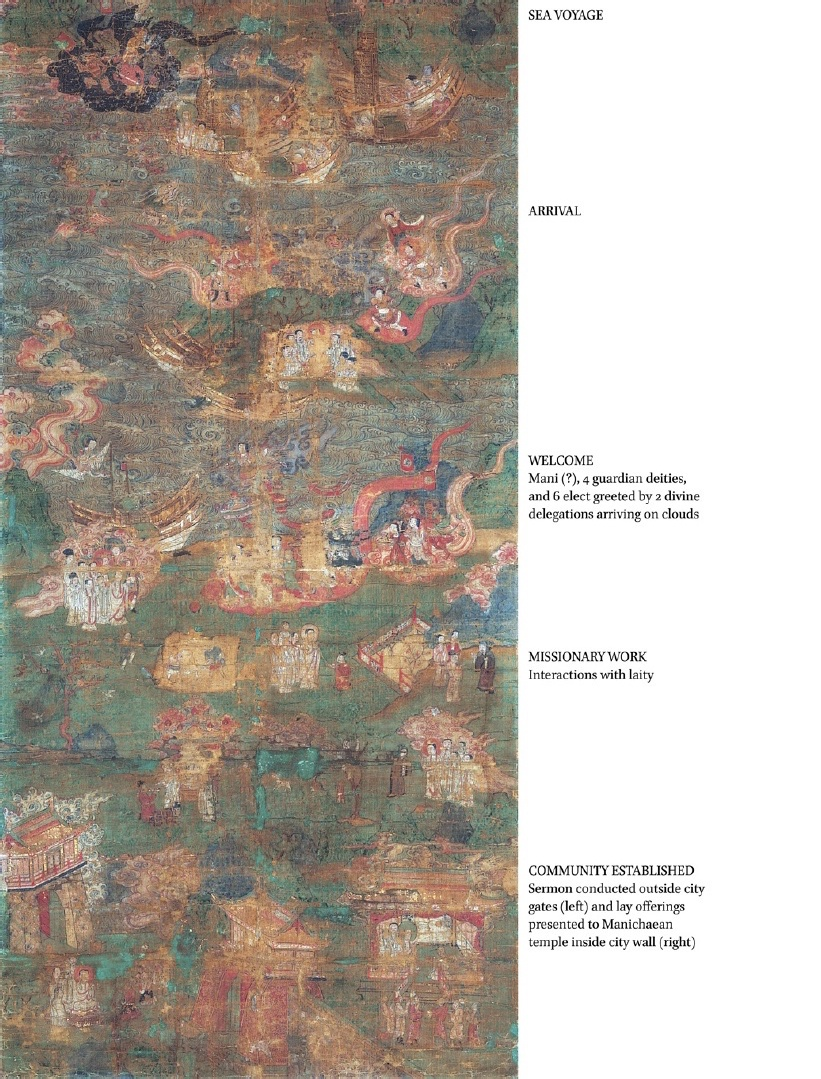
Analysis by Zsuzsanna Gulácsi

Like the other two Manichaean works "Sermon on Mani's Teaching of Salvation" and "Mani's Community Established", this picture also depicts several scenes, but it is different from the former and the latter in terms of levels With the collage technique, the distinction and boundary between the various scenes in this painting is not obvious, and the picture is damaged, and some details are difficult to determine, but it can be roughly divided into five scenes. The first scene in the top position depicts five ships sailing on the sea, carrying Mani and his followers (believers). Mani is standing on the bow of the ship on the left, wearing a white robe with red rims unique to Manichaeism, with a green halo behind his head. A sea monster is drawn in the sea near the lower left of Mani. There are five demons standing on a dark cloud in the upper left mid-air, holding weapons and military flags. On the whole, this scene should depict that the missionary group led by Mani defeated the demon's obstruction, and the swift ship pushed the five demons to one side and continued to drive forward.

In the second scene, two of the five boats can be seen mooring on the shore; on the shore, a senior priest with a red head and sitting on a lotus platform is preaching to the seven ordinary priests around him, explaining The mission has arrived at its destination. In the third scene, there are still two boats dropping anchor and a welcoming ceremony is being held on the shore. On the left, you can see Mani leading seven priests and four soldiers with bald heads, and on the right is a group of gods who greet them, riding two colorful clouds and fog from the sky.

The fourth scene is divided into four smaller scenes, describing the interaction between the priests and the laity, that is, the missionary work. The fifth scene can be divided into two parts, left and right, separated by a city wall. The left side describes a sermon meeting, which should be held in a natural environment on the outskirts; the right side is a Manichaean temple in the city, where lay believers gather in front of the temple to make offerings. The last scene can be seen as a summary of the entire painting, showing the success of the mission and the final establishment of the Mani Church. Therefore, what is depicted in "Mani's Community Established" is naturally a follow-up event of this painting.

== Excursus ==
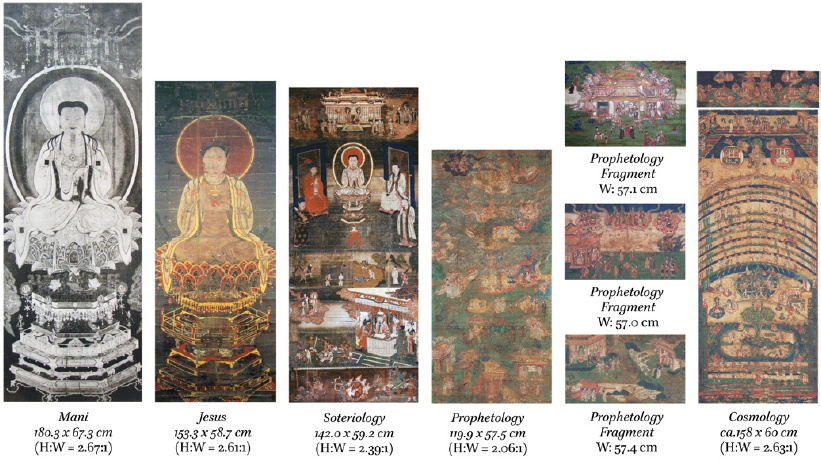
Eight Silk Painting Atlas

Eight silk hanging scrolls with Manichaean didactic images from southern China from between the 12th and the 15th centuries. They can be divided into four categories:

Two single portraits (depicting Mani and Jesus)

- Icon of Mani
- Manichaean Painting of the Buddha Jesus

One scroll depicting Salvation Theory (Soteriology)

- Sermon on Mani's Teaching of Salvation

Four scrolls depicting Prophetology (Prophetology)

- Mani's Parents
- Birth of Mani
- Episodes from Mani's Missionary Work
- Mani's Community Established

One scroll depicting Cosmology (Cosmology)

- Manichaean Diagram of the Universe
