= Birth of Mani =

Manichean silk cloth color painting

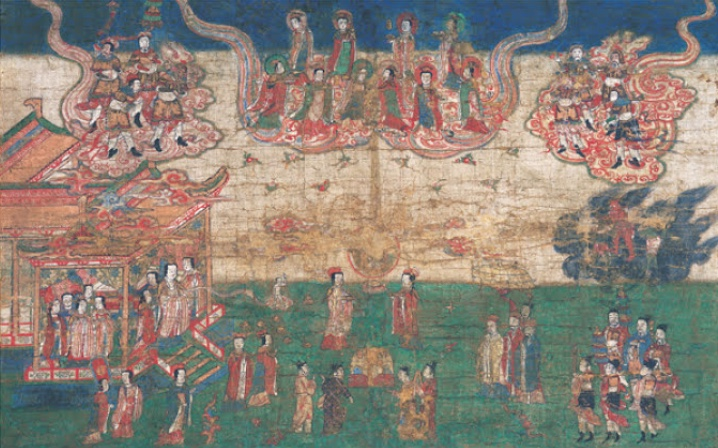
- Artist: Unknown
- Year: 14th century (Yuan Dynasty)
- Type: Silk, ink and gold
- Dimensions: 35.6 cm × 56.9 cm (14.0 in × 22.4 in)
- Location: Kyushu National Museum; Dazaifu, Fukuoka

The Birth of Mani is a Manichean silk cloth color painting painted in the Fujian Zhejiang area during the Yuan period, depicting the founder of the sect Mani The scene of birth, a scholar who specializes in Manichaeism Ma Xiaohe called it "a rare treasure". This picture is now in the collection of the Kyushu National Museum in Japan. The drawing technique and artistic style are similar to Mani's Community Established, Mani's Parents, and Manichean Universe Map. It was originally part of a large-scale Manichean silk painting; however, now the silk painting has been lost, leaving only the birth picture.

== Description ==
According to the research of the Hungarian Asian religious art historian Zsuzsanna Gulácsi, this painting mainly presents three themes: glory, incarnation, and birth celebration. The top of the center of the picture depicts ten Ji Letian in brightly colored costumes, driving two colorful auspicious clouds from the sky. Their position in the picture and the headlights behind their heads indicate their extraordinary identities. On each side of Ji Letian, there are four gods dressed as generals, wearing gold armor and black boots, standing on the colorful clouds and fog. They are holding tributes or banners. They may be the eight heavenly soldiers (English: soldierly angels; Latin: angelorum exercitibus ) appearing in Manichae literature and art, belonging to the King of Glory. The image of these generals is also seen in the seventh heaven in the Manichaean Diagram of the Universe.

There is a transparent sphere suspended on the lotus stand directly below Ji Le Tian, surrounded by ten flying flowers. The sphere is in the very center of the painting, with a female supporter holding a tribute on each side. The image in the sphere is damaged, but it can still be seen that the original depiction is a figure sitting on a lotus position, with head light and aureola. Given the position of the sphere in the picture, the portrait is likely to represent the baby Mani. Below the sphere can be seen a red lacquer box (baby crib) under the canopy. The newly born Mani slept in it. Around it were live musicians and dancers, as well as dignitaries who came to celebrate.

On the left of the picture is a luxurious mansion, which depicts two scenes: Mani’s mother is full of beauty before and after Mani’s birth. Man Yan was dressed in a white dress and blue dress, wearing a high crown, and surrounded by maids. The scene facing the viewer is before birth, and the scene on the right side of the stairs is after birth. It can be seen that the baby Mani is born on the cloud from his mother's chest. There are six lotus seats and three gems in front of the baby. Other patterns scattered on the green ground include a golden cross, located on the lower right side of the transparent sphere, which should symbolize the "Cross of Light". At the bottom of the mansion on the left, three noble women led two maids to the paint box where Mani was asleep. The lower right portrays three groups of people, all men, among them nobles wearing white, red, and blue robes, followed by an attendant holding a white canopy in their hands. Behind the dignitaries is a man in a blue robe, surrounded by five standard bearers. He is most likely Mani's father Badi. Above them, in the middle part on the far right side, three demons can be seen standing on a dark cloud.

== Gallery ==
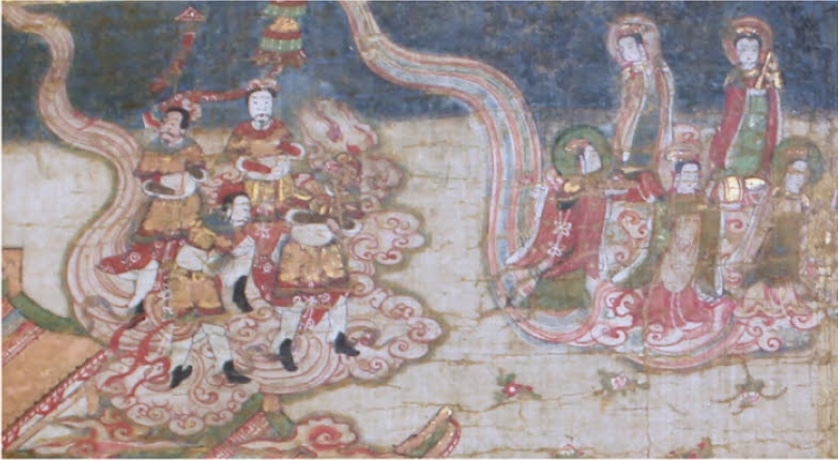
Joy Lotte and Heavenly Army God Generals

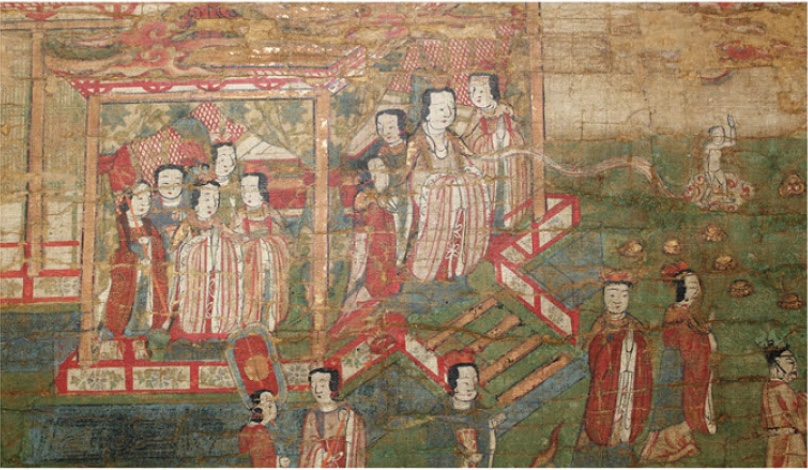
Many Mani's Mother

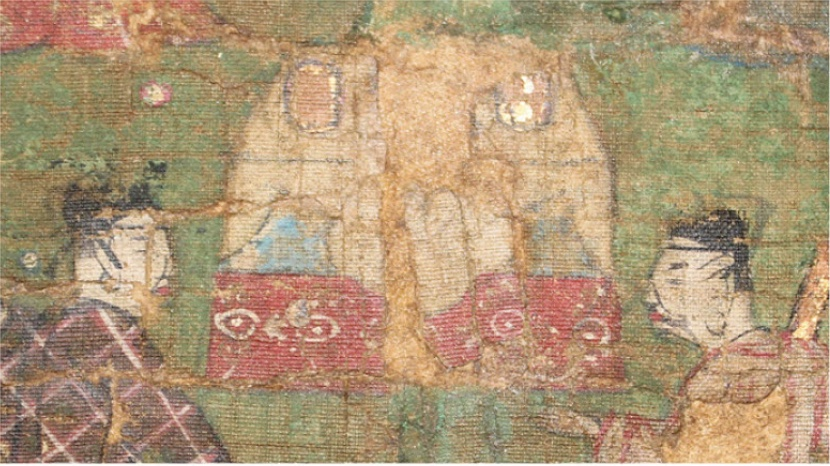
Mani's Lacquer Box Baby Bed

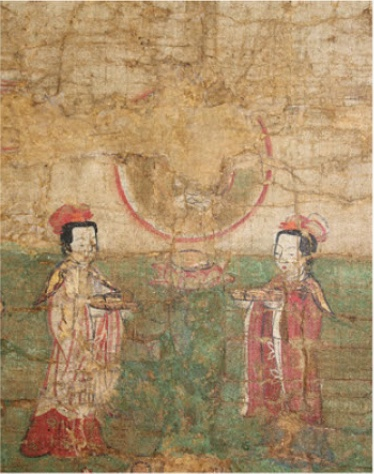
The statue of Mani in the sphere and two supporters

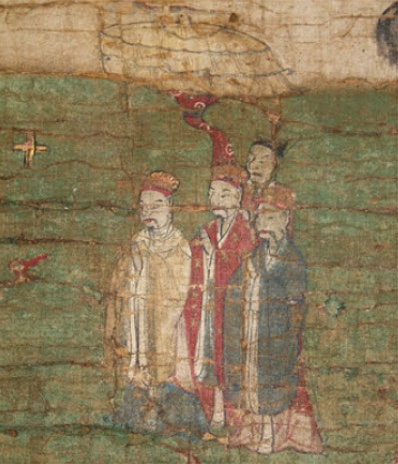
Three dignitaries and attendants supporting Huagai

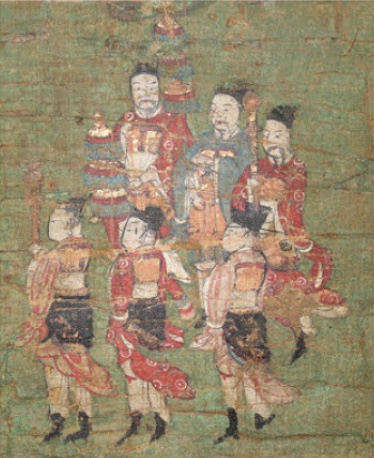
The dignitaries in blue robes are probably Mani’s father Badi, and five standard bearers

== Excursus ==
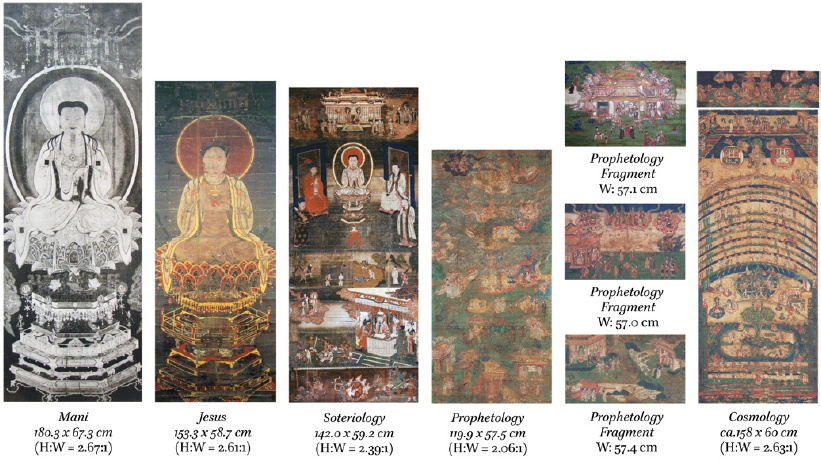
Eight Silk Painting Atlas

Eight silk hanging scrolls with Manichaean didactic images from southern China from between the 12th and the 15th centuries. They can be divided into four categories:

Two single portraits (depicting Mani and Jesus)

- Icon of Mani
- Manichaean Painting of the Buddha Jesus

One scroll depicting Salvation Theory (Soteriology)

- Sermon on Mani's Teaching of Salvation

Four scrolls depicting Prophetology (Prophetology)

- Mani's Parents
- Birth of Mani
- Episodes from Mani's Missionary Work
- Mani's Community Established

One scroll depicting Cosmology (Cosmology)

- Manichaean Diagram of the Universe
