= Gulácsi =

Gulácsi is a Hungarian surname. Notable people with this surname include:

- Péter Gulácsi (born 1990), Hungarian footballer
- Zsuzsanna Gulácsi (born 1966), Hungarian-American historian
