= Manichaean Diagram of the Universe =

Yuan dynasty silk painting

- 摩尼敎宇宙圖 (Chinese), マニ教宇宙図 (Japanese)
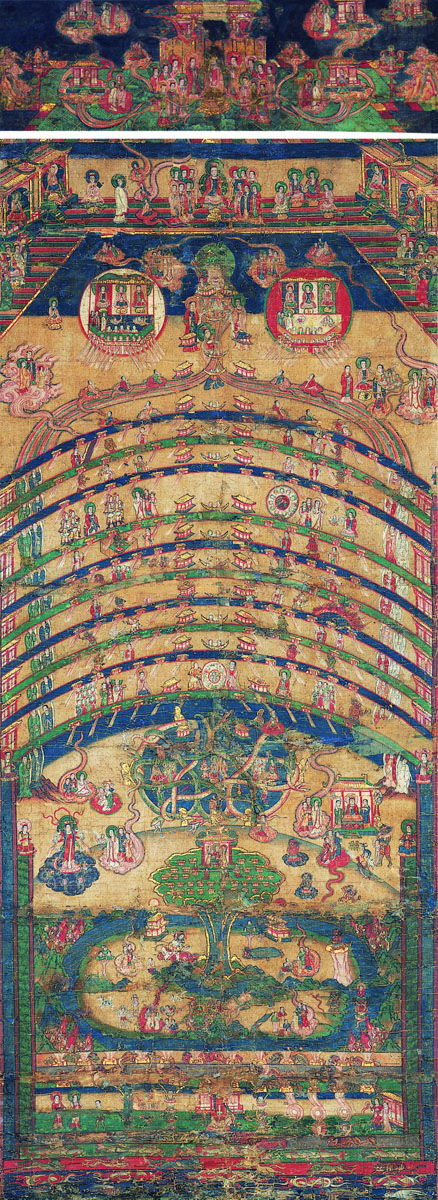
- Artist: Unknown
- Year: 1271–1368
- Type: Hanging scroll, paint and gold on silk (shown digitally matched from three parts)
- Dimensions: 158 cm × 60 cm (62 in × 24 in)
- Location: Private collection in Japan

The Manichaean Diagram of the Universe (Chinese: 摩尼教宇宙圖; Japanese: マニ教宇宙図) is a Yuan dynasty silk painting describing the cosmology of Manichaeism, in other words, the structure of universe according to Manichaean vision. The painting in vivid colours on a silk cloth (originally measuring approximately 158 by 60 centimetres) survives in three parts, whose proper relation to one another and digital reconstruction (shown here) was published by Zsuzsanna Gulácsi.

The painting was discovered by Yutaka Yoshida with his research team in 2010, and identified as a depiction of the cosmos according to the Manichaean religion. According to the team, this piece of art was probably produced by a painter from southern China (Zhejiang or Fujian province) around the period of Yuan dynasty, which ruled China from 1271 to 1368; and the only painting currently known that covers Manichaeism's cosmologic view in complete form. How and when it was transferred to Japan is a mystery.

== Description ==
Under the Manichaean view of the universe, the world is formed by ten layers of heaven and eight layers of the Earth. The separated top section depicts paradise, below it are the sun (right) and moon palaces, which are shown in two circles. Then the ten layers of heaven, where angels and the twelve zodiac signs are included. Below the ten firmaments of heaven are the eight layers of the Earth, the Mount Meru is shown as a mushroom-shaped mountain on the ground where humans live; and hell is depicted in the lowermost part.

== Analysis ==
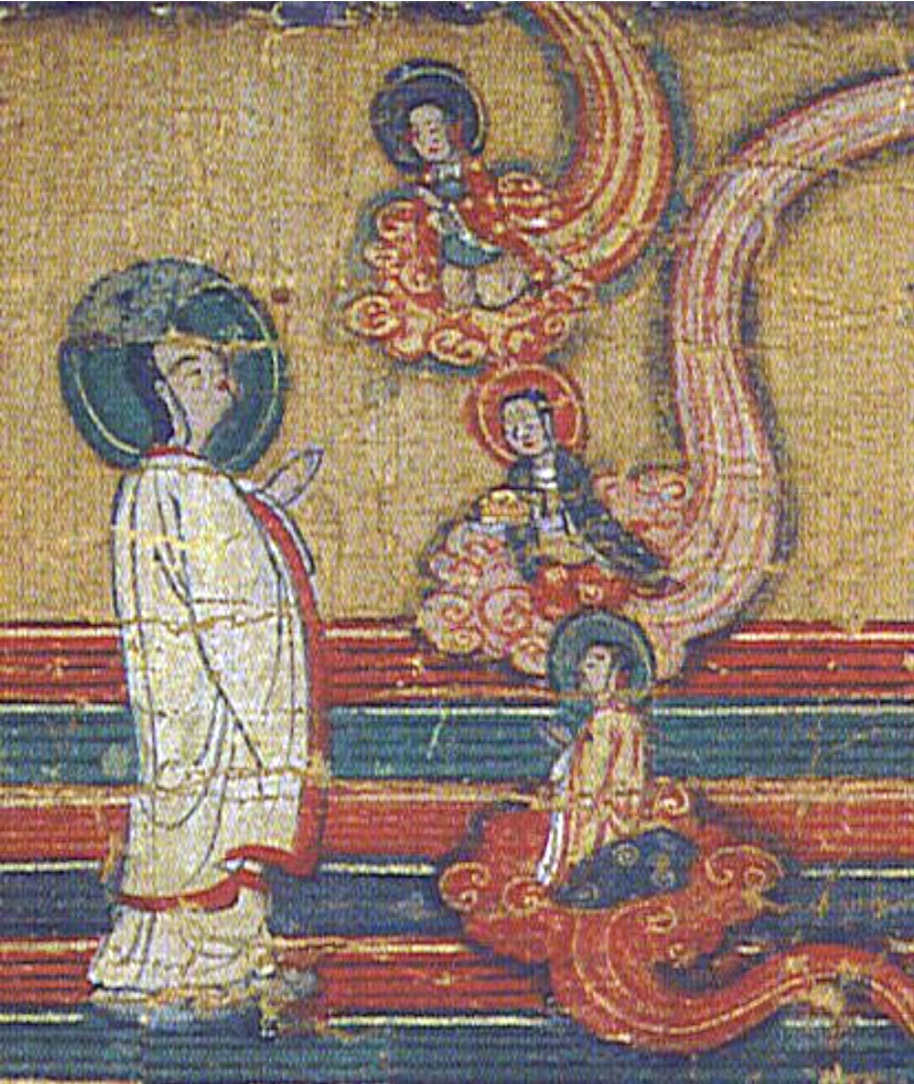
"Mani as observer": the white robed priest, the silhouette of his face against the green halo.

After carefully studying the painting, and comparing it with the Manichaean materials found in Xinjiang, the westernmost region of China, the members of Yoshida's research team concluded that the painting is Manichaean because it includes a priest wearing a white robe with red piping that is characteristic of Manichaean priests. According to the art historian Zsuzsanna Gulácsi, the white robed priest—the silhouette of whose face against the green halo—is a depiction of the prophet Mani.

In 2009, Professor Yoshida raised an idea that this painting might constitute a Chinese version of Mani's Book of Pictures, and subsequently by Gábor Kósa.

In her book Mani's Pictures: The Didactic Images of the Manichaeans from Sasanian Mesopotamia to Uygur Central Asia and Tang-Ming China, the Hungarian-born American art historian Zsuzsanna Gulácsi, who is also a specialist in Manichaean art, explaining the possible relation between this painting and Mani's Book of Pictures. She argues that this hanging scroll is not a canonical object in Manichaeism, because the canonical Manichaean images were only designed for picture books with documented heights ranging between 8 cm and 25 cm. After the introduction of hanging scrolls into Manichaean artistic production by the 10th century, it started to integrate a number of individual canonical images in one composite display. "The result was the emergence of modified canonical images. The Diagram of the Universe is an example of such a modified image."

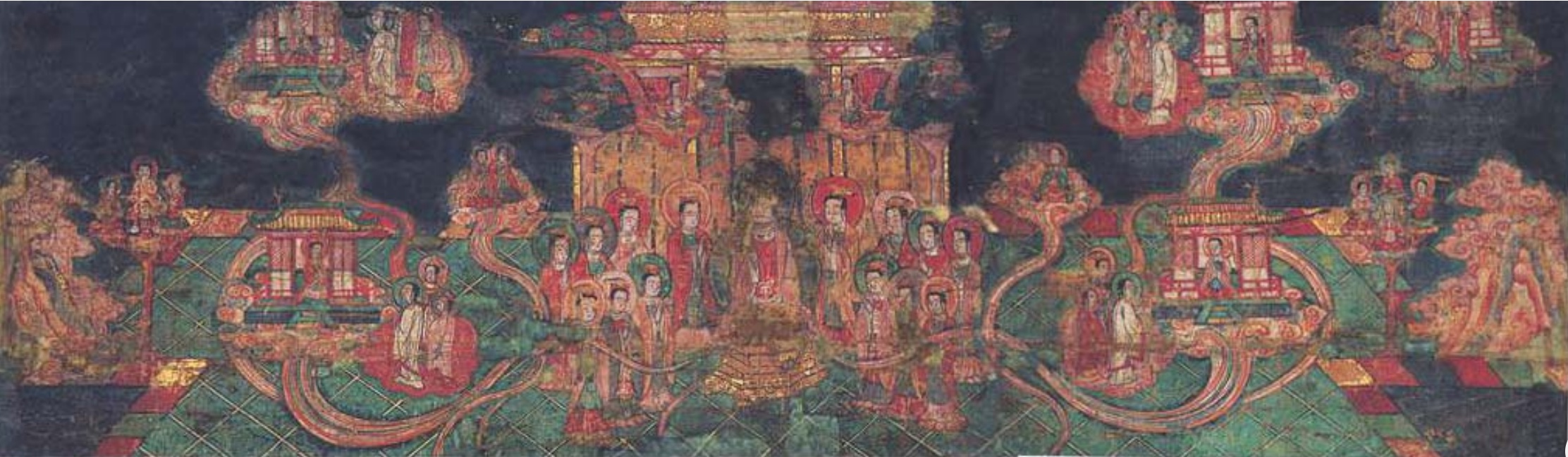
Top section: the paradise scene (realm of light).

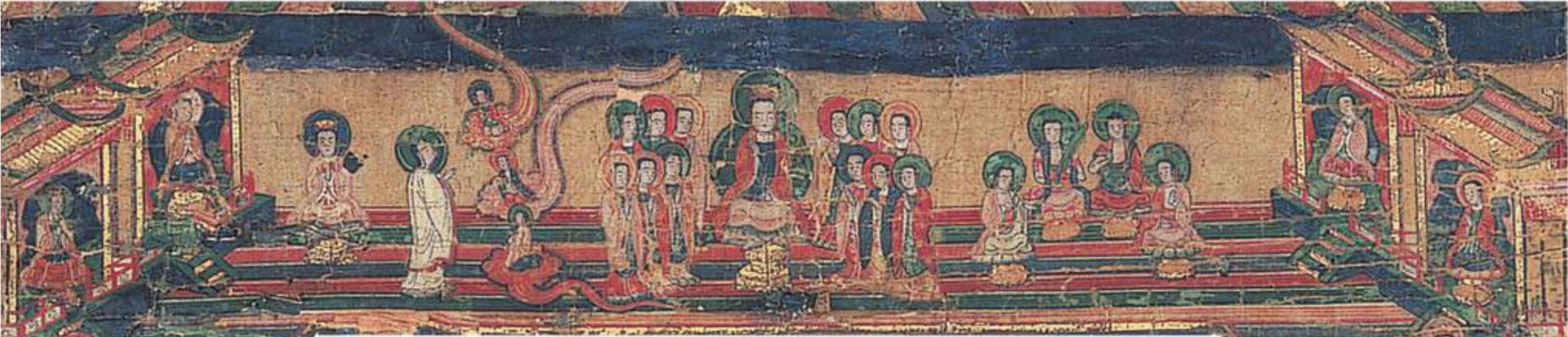
Above the sun and moon palaces: the heaven scene.

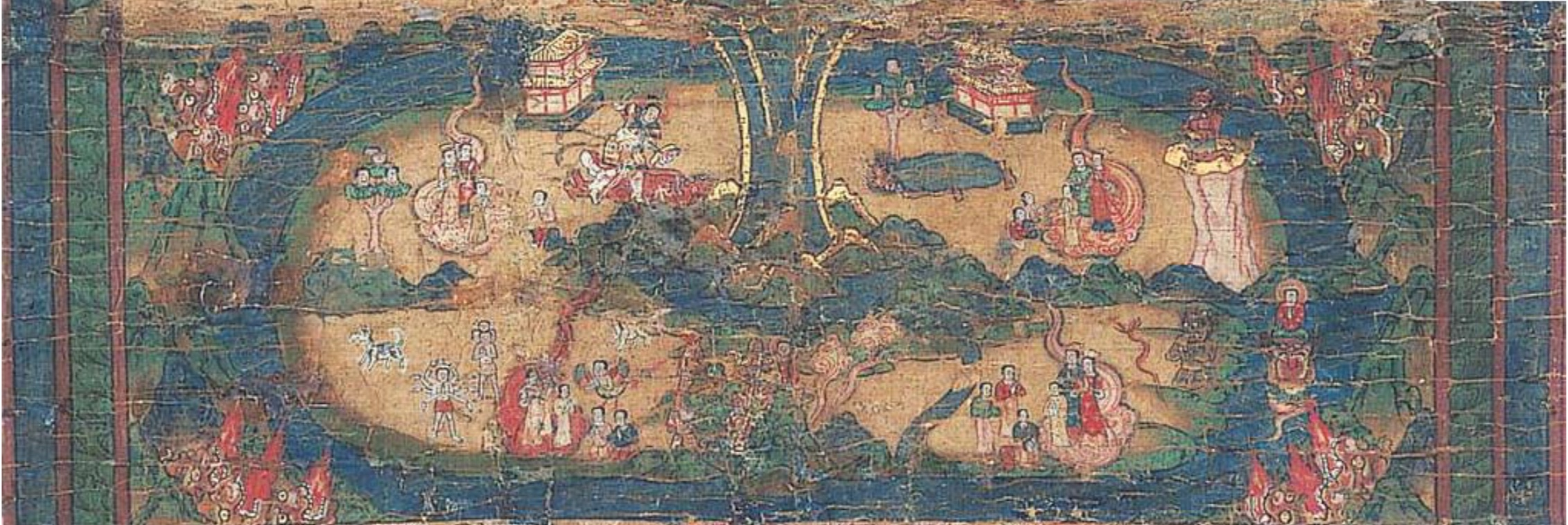
Foot of the Mount Meru: the mortal world.

Gulácsi designed a visual syntax with Jason BeDuhn to analyse the painting:

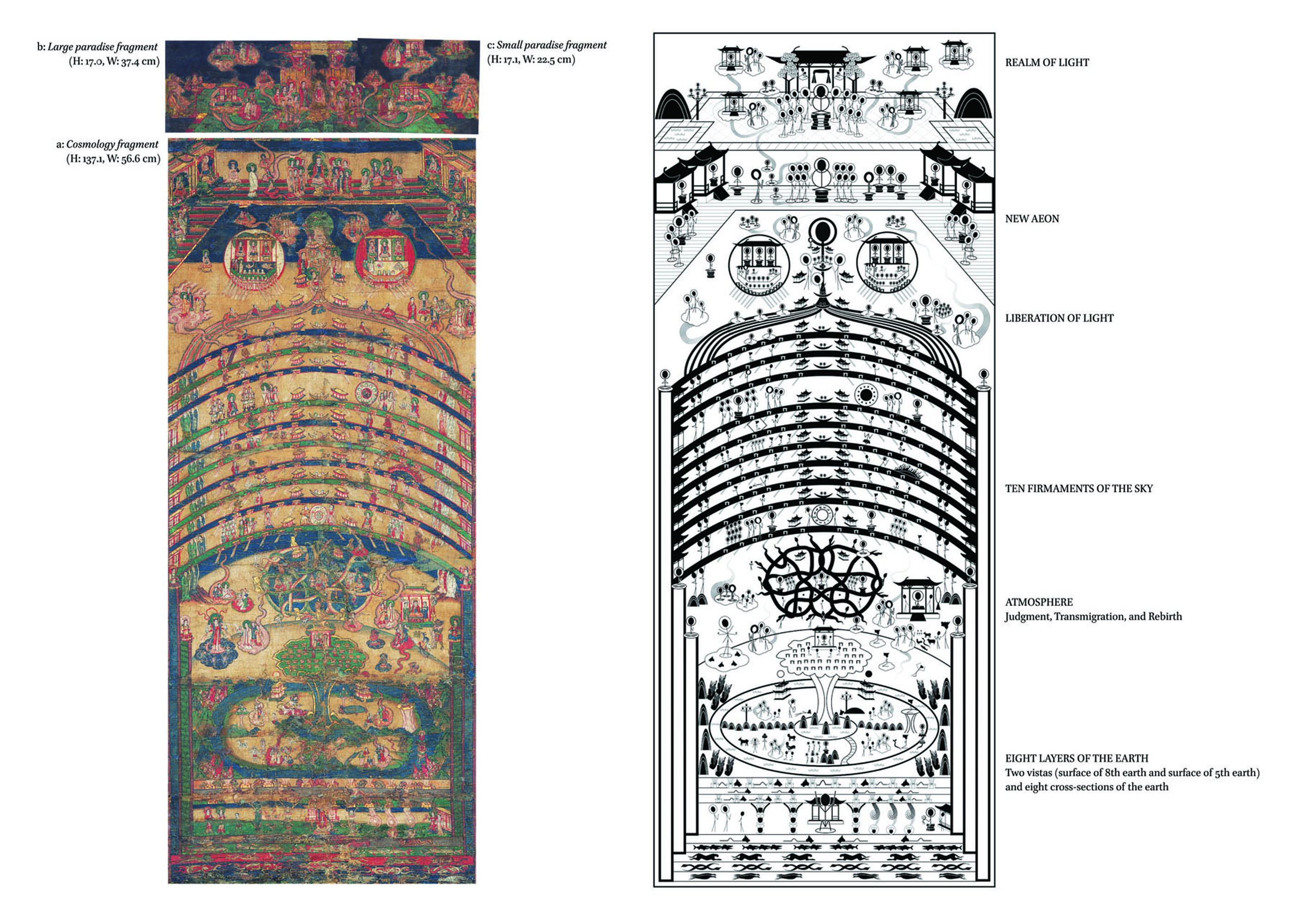
Visual syntax of the Diagram of the Universe

The design (of the Diagram of the Universe) subordinates multitudes of originally individual canonical images to the vision of the cosmos as in the shape of a giant human (Gr. macranthropos), explained as the underlying structure of the universe in one of the earliest Manichaean texts. This Manichaean teaching governs the overall structure of the Chinese Manichaean Diagram of the Universe. An abstract anthropomorphic design is shown across much of the picture plane that measures over 150 cm in height—the head and neck in the New Aeon, the ten ribs of the chest in the sky, the phallos as Mount Sumeru, and the hips as the surface of the earth—enlarged to a scale that would have been impossible in any editions of Mani's Book of Pictures. […] The Diagram of the Universe cannot be construed as a Chinese version of Mani's Book of Pictures, since picture books and hanging scrolls coexisted in both Uyghur and southern Chinese Manichaeism. There is no evidence that the monumental vertical design of East Asian hanging scrolls replaced the traditional small-scale horizontal layout of West Asian picture books in Manichaean canonical art. Thus, this painting is best classified as a late medieval and uniquely Chinese development of Manichaean didactic art. Its thirteenth/fourteenth-century iconography greatly expands upon a core set of Manichaean motifs, while conveying Manichaean doctrine in a distinctly Chinese visual language of its time.

== Gallery ==
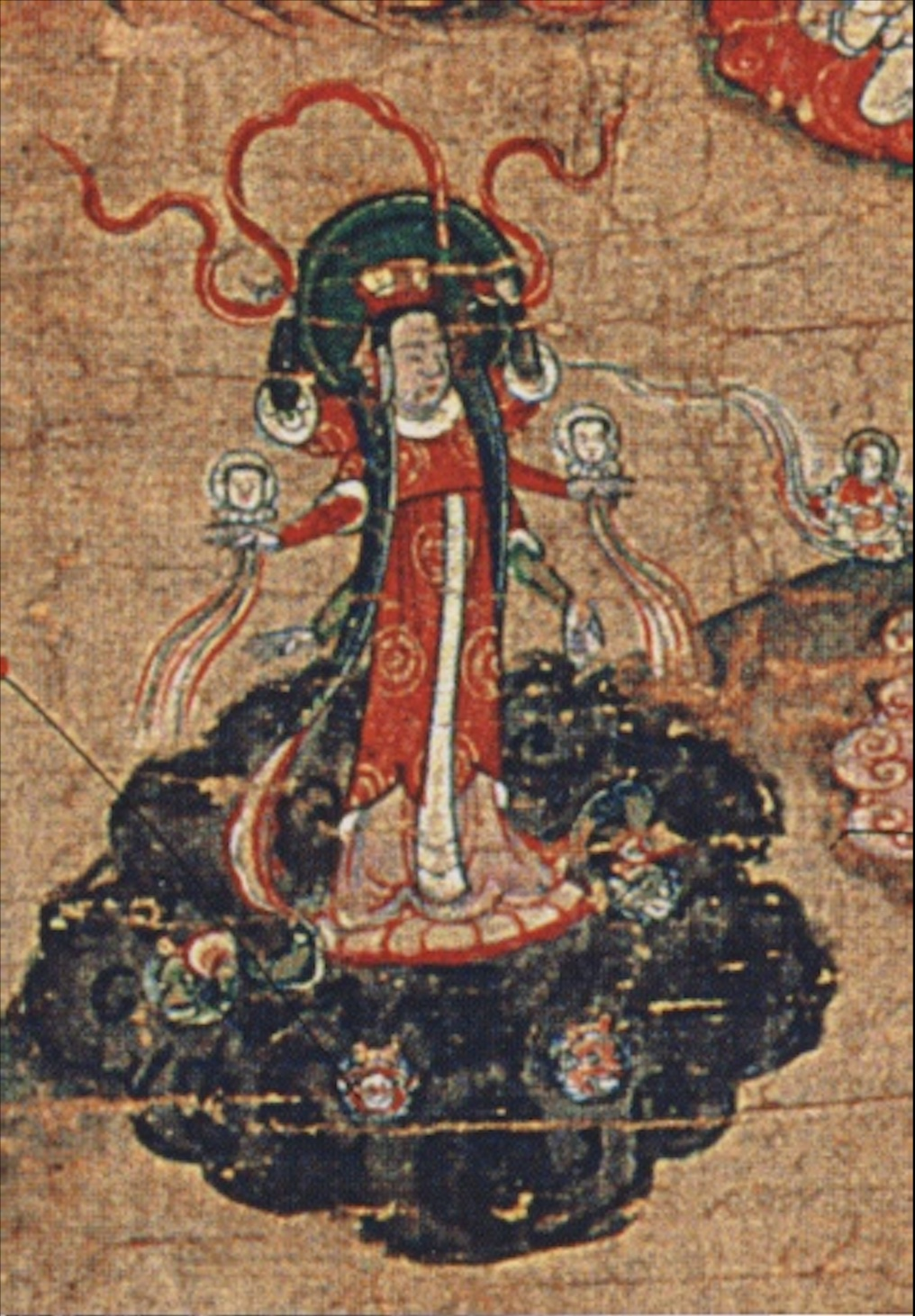
Detail: Virgin of Light.

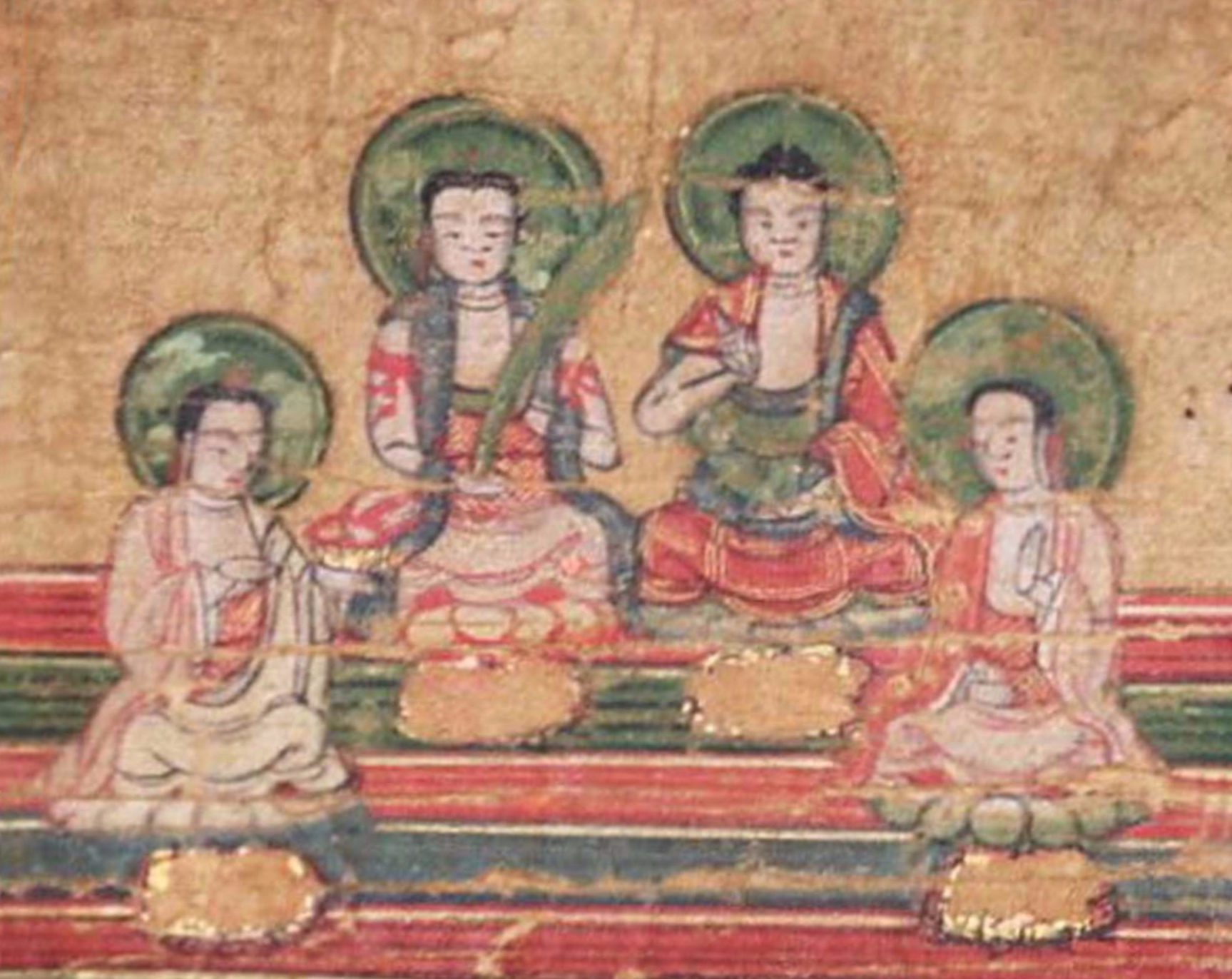
The four prophets, from left to right: Mani, Zarathustra, Buddha and Jesus.

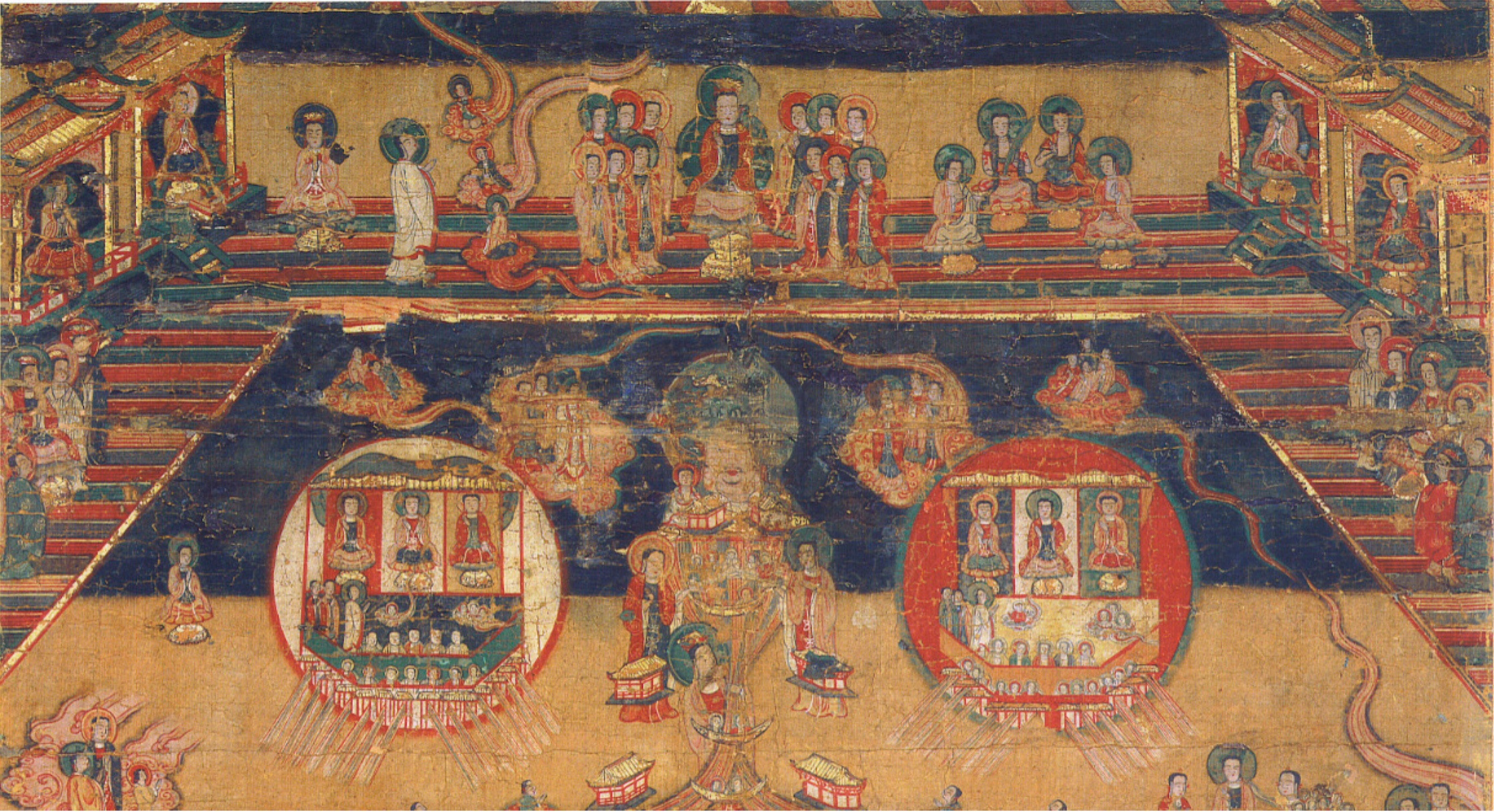
Detail: The sun (right) and moon palaces.

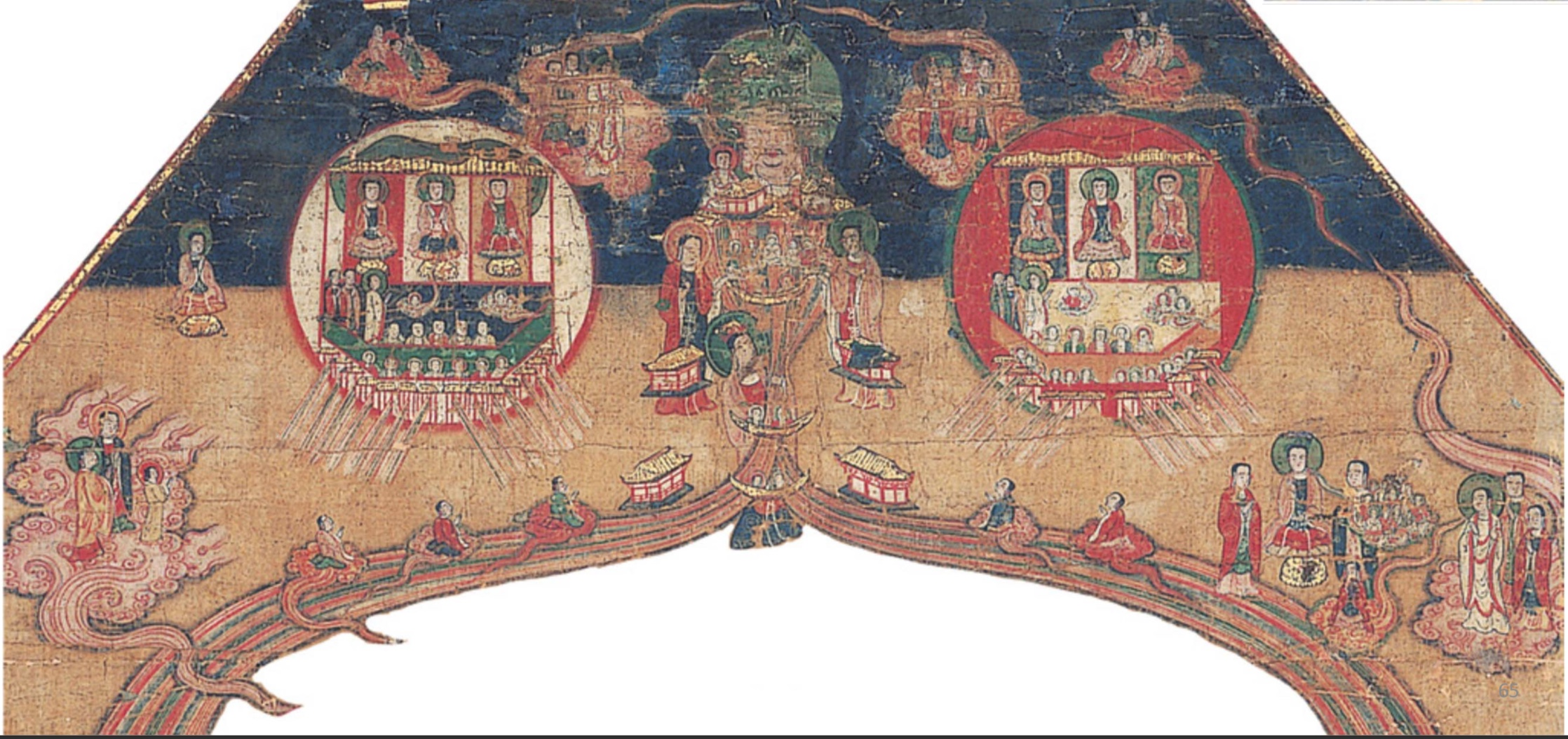
Sun and moon palaces with the first firmament.

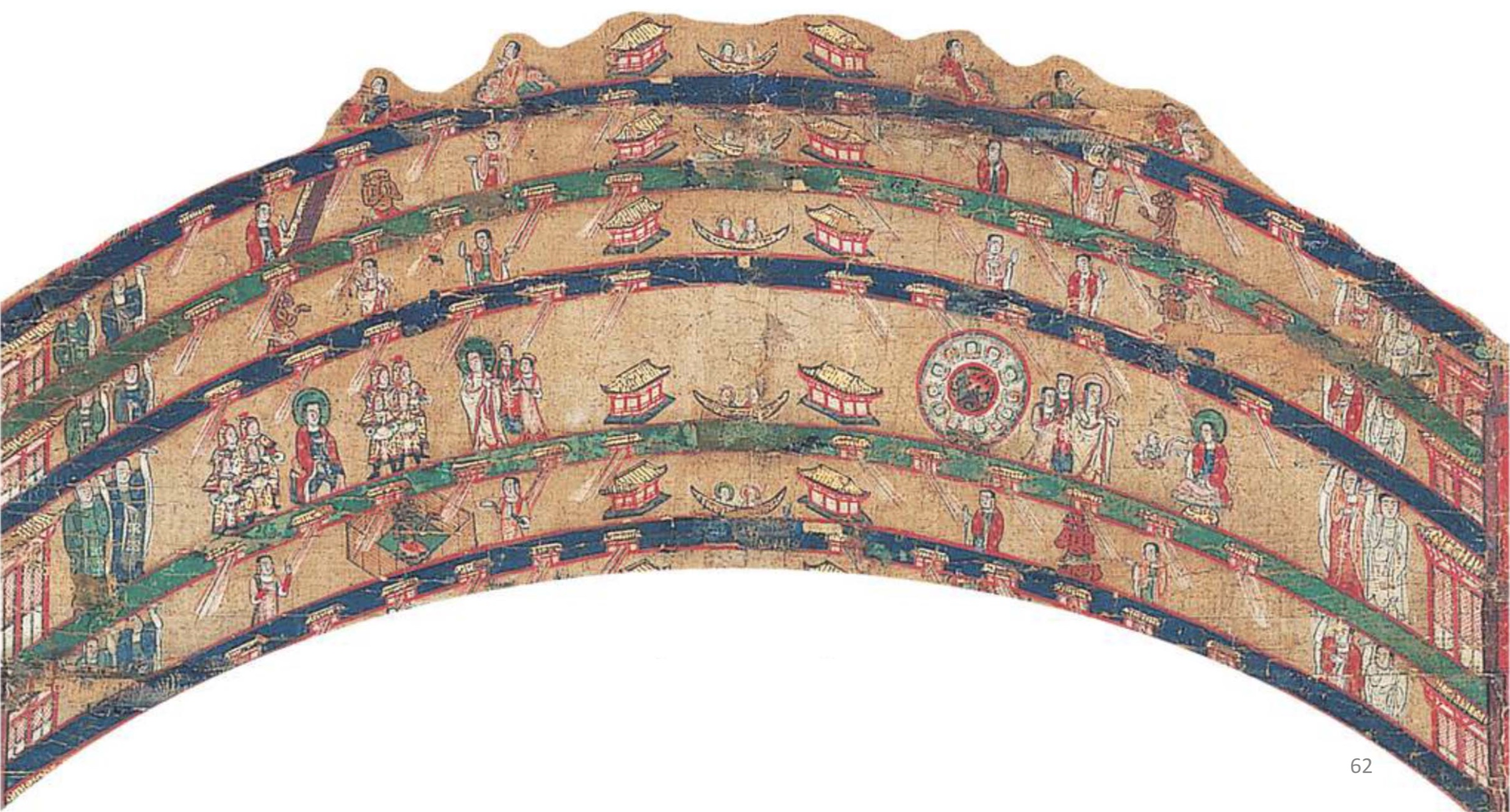
The second to sixth firmaments.

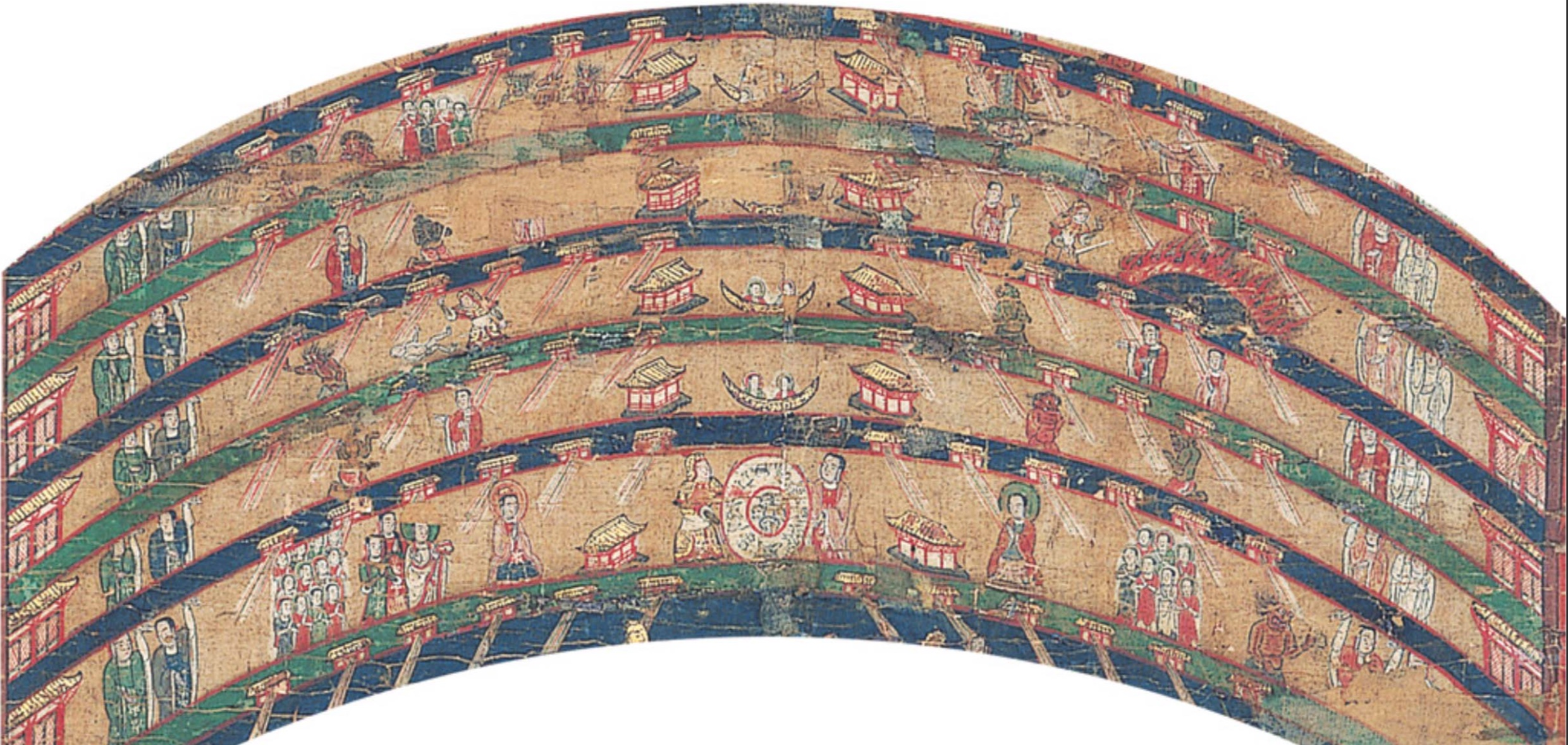
The sixth to tenth firmaments.

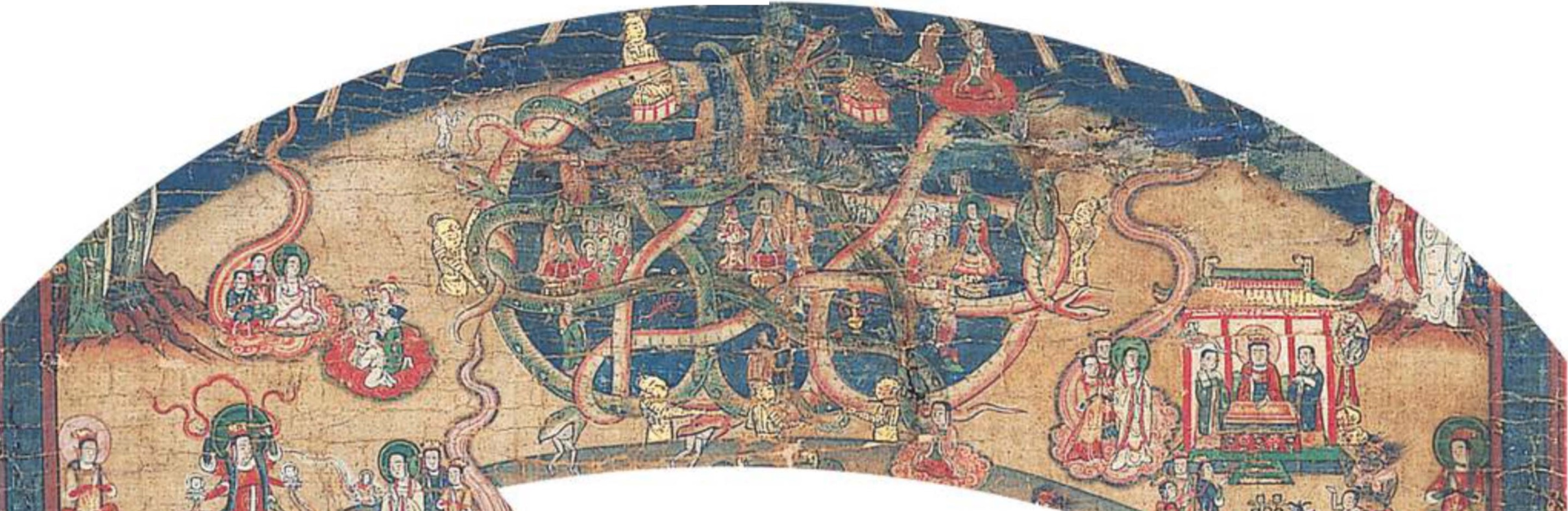
The atmosphere where the judgement after death.

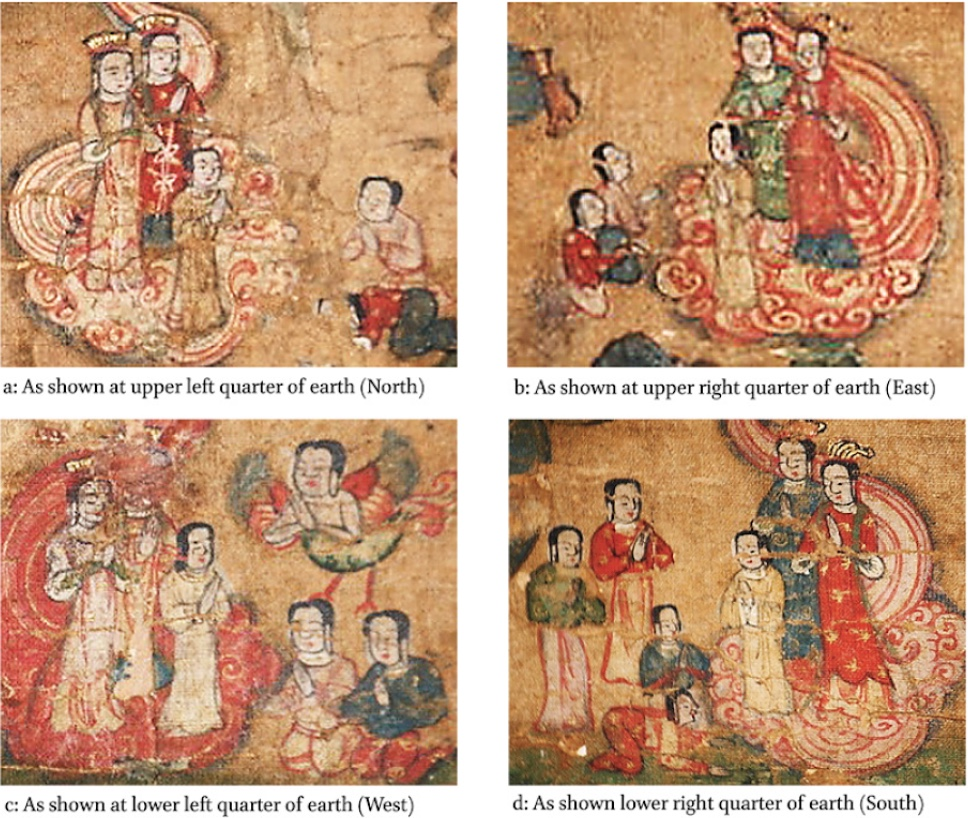
Four salvation-seeking souls shown around the foot of Mount Meru.

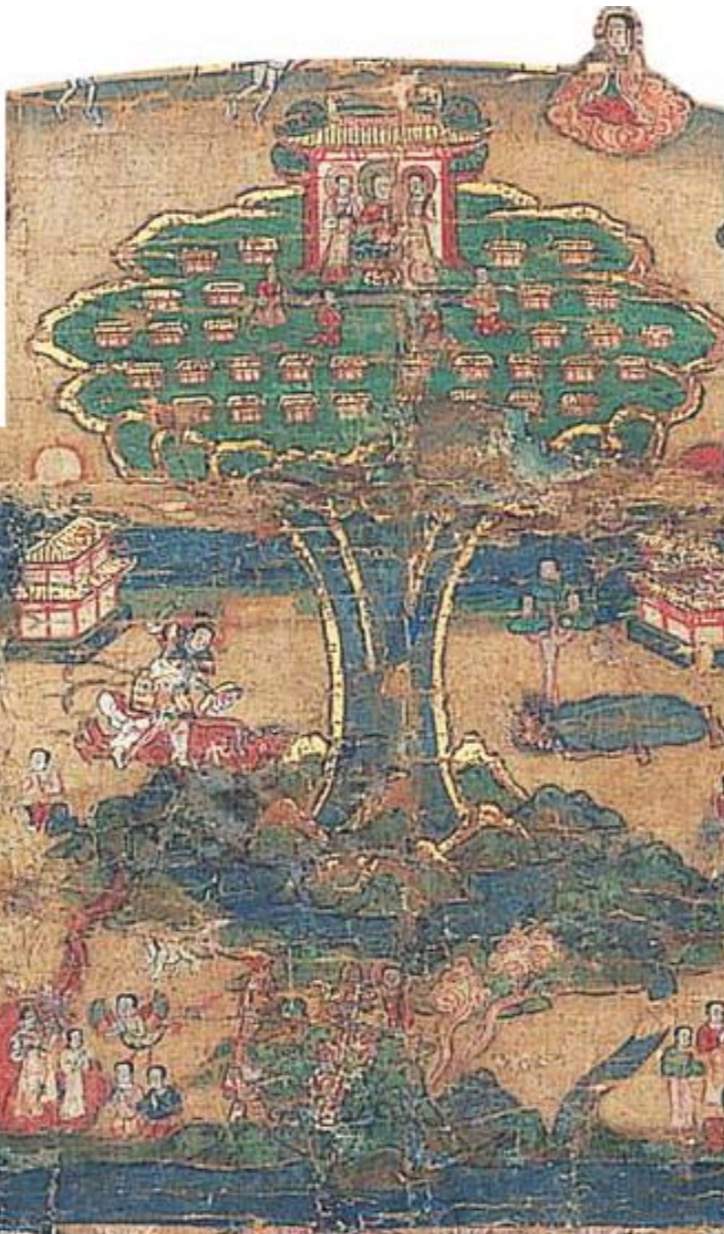
The Mount Meru or the phallos.

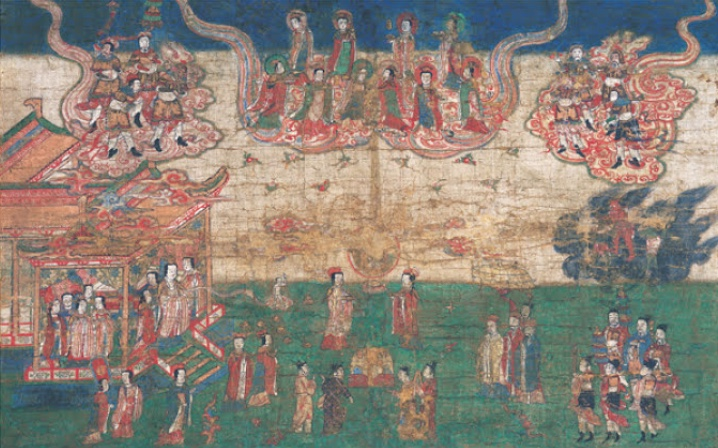
Mani's Birth, a Yuan dynasty Manichaean painting designed in the same style as the Diagram.

== Excursus ==
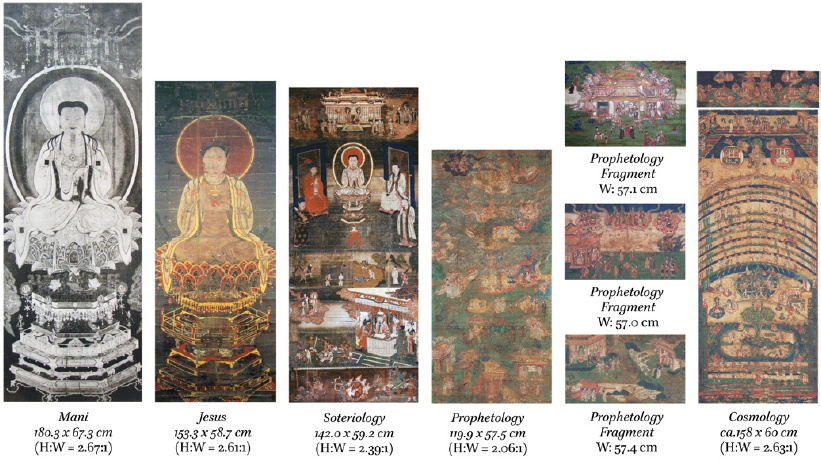
Eight Silk Painting Atlas

Eight silk hanging scrolls with Manichaean didactic images from southern China from between the 12th and the 15th centuries, which can be divided into four categories:

Two single portraits (depicting Mani and Jesus)

- Icon of Mani
- Manichaean Painting of the Buddha Jesus

One scroll depicting Salvation Theory (Soteriology)

- Sermon on Mani's Teaching of Salvation

Four scrolls depicting Prophetology (Prophetology)

- Mani's Parents
- Birth of Mani
- Episodes from Mani's Missionary Work
- Mani's Community Established

One scroll depicting Cosmology (Cosmology)

- Manichaean Diagram of the Universe

== See also ==
- Chinese Manichaeism
