= Manichaean Painting of the Buddha Jesus =

Painting of Jesus Christ as a Manichaean Prophet

- 夷數佛幀 (Chinese), キリスト聖像 (Japanese)
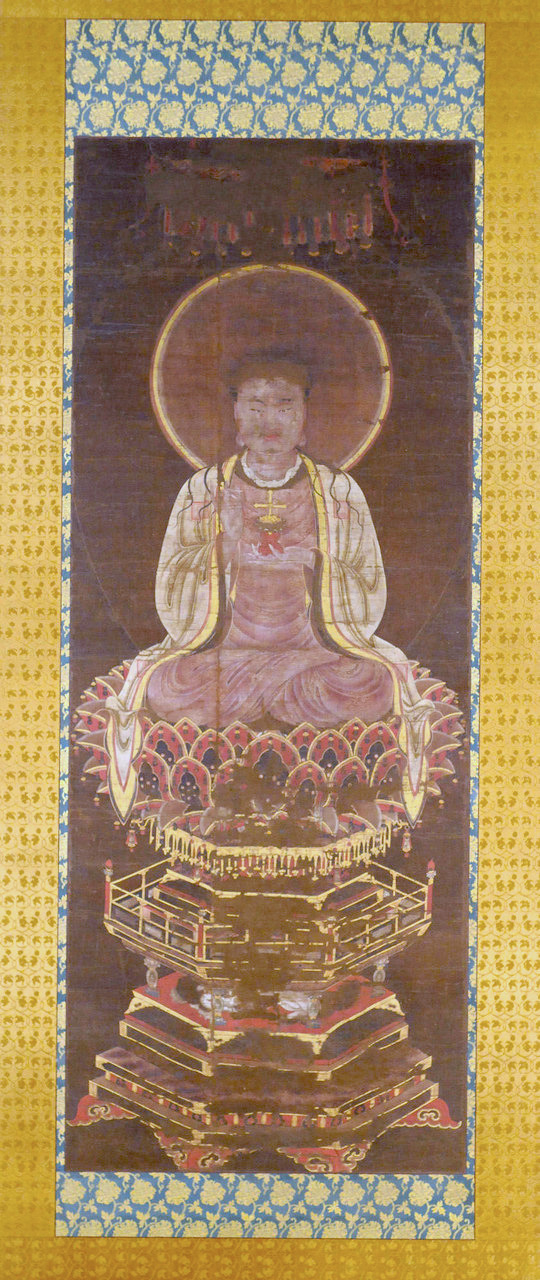
- Artist: Unknown
- Year: 12th to 13th centuries
- Type: Hanging scroll, colours and gold on silk
- Dimensions: 153.5 cm × 58.7 cm (60.4 in × 23.1 in)
- Location: Seiunji Temple; Kōshū

The Manichaean Painting of the Buddha Jesus (Chinese: 夷數佛幀; pinyin: Yí shù fó zhēn; Wade–Giles: I^{2}-shu^{4} fo^{2}-chên^{1}; Japanese: キリスト聖像; rōmaji: Kirisuto Sei-zō; lit. 'Sacred Image of Christ'), is a Chinese Southern Song dynasty silk hanging scroll preserved at the Seiunji Temple in Kōshū, Yamanashi, Japan. It measures 153.5 cm in height, 58.7 cm in width, dates from the 12th to 13th centuries, and depicts a solitary nimbate figure on a dark-brown medieval Chinese silk. According to the Hungarian historian Zsuzsanna Gulácsi, this painting is one of the six documented Chinese Manichaean hanging scrolls from Zhejiang province from the early 12th century, which are titled Yishu fo zhen (lit. "Silk Painting of the Buddha [Prophet] Jesus"). (Note: "夷數" (pinyin: Yíshù; Wade–Giles: I-shu) is the Chinese translation of the name Jesus by the Manichaeans.)

== Description ==
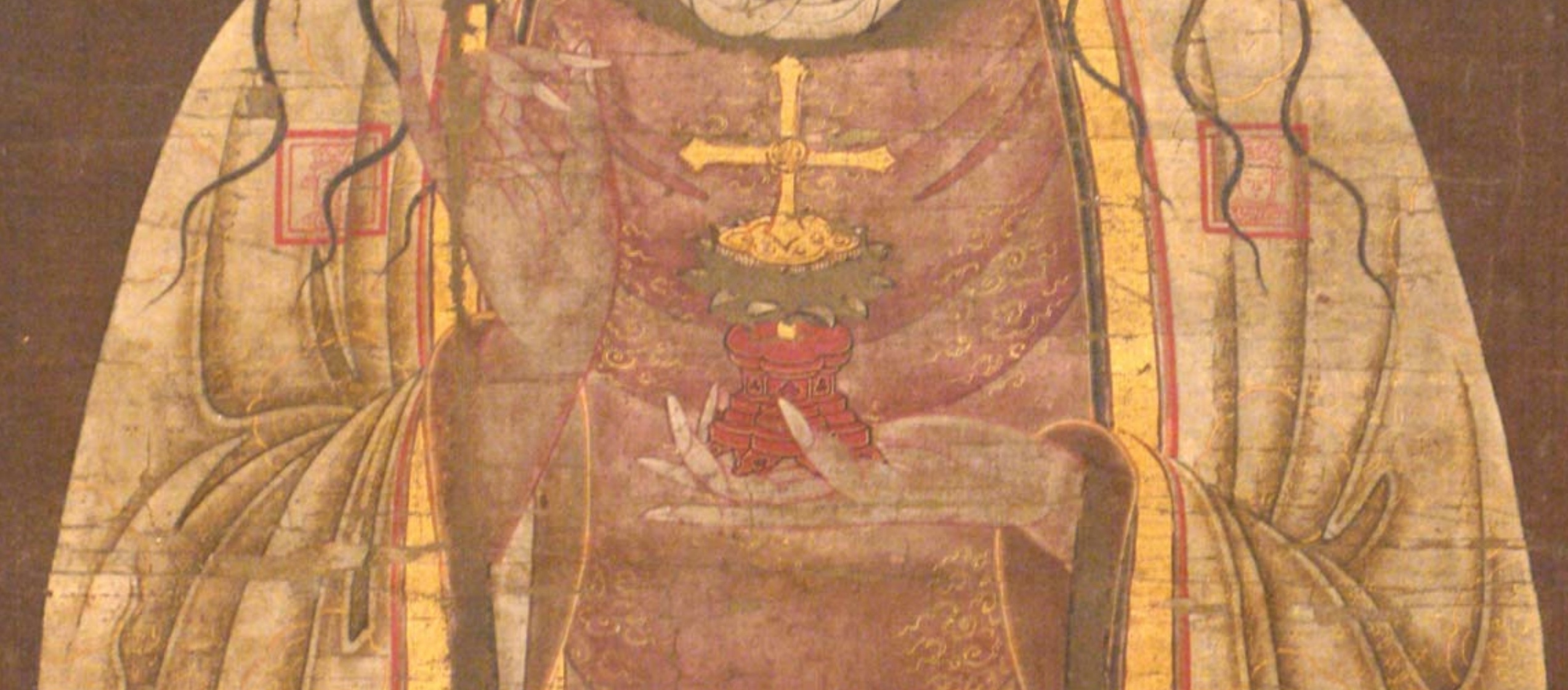
Detail: Cross of Light.

The painting depicts a monumental, solitary figure, with glittering lines of gold and various colours. The upper half is occupied by a cloaked deity seated in lotus position and hands held close to one another in front of the chest. He is holding in his left hand a red lotus pedestal on where a small gold cross (Cross of Light) is seated. In addition to the nimbus around the head, there is a faint outline of a large mandorla that frames the body and reaches the upwards, where a tasselled canopy hung above the nimbus. The lower half is filled by an elaborate pedestal, which is a multilayered hexagonal stand supporting a lotus with lush sets of petals that open in five orderly rings. Each petal evokes the form of a miniature altar.

== Background ==
According to the Song Huiyao Jigao, there were six paintings in the possession of a Chinese Manichaean church used as objects of learning and veneration:

- Silk painting of the buddha Wonderful Water (妙水佛幀)
- Silk painting of the buddha First Thought (先意佛幀)
- Silk painting of the buddha Jesus (夷數佛幀)
- Silk painting of Good and Evil (善惡幀)
- Silk painting of the Royal Prince (太子幀)
- Silk painting of the Four Kings of Heaven (四天王幀)

== History ==
The history of this hanging scroll represents a unique case of religious metamorphosis, for it has been used by three religions. It can be divided into three episodes: before ca. 1552, the image was venerated by Manichaeans from southern China. From 1552 (or 1608) to 1612, during this period of sixty years (at most), the painting functioned as a Christian object in Japan. No written records, only legend at Seiunji Temple, suggests that the painting belonged to an executed Christian daimyō Arima Harunobu, before it ended up in the Buddhist temple. The most recent, which has lasted approximately four hundred years, when the scroll has been used as a Buddhist work of art in the Seiunji Temple in Japan. The Japanese Buddhists considered it a depiction of Ākāśagarbha (Japanese: 虚空蔵菩薩), a celestial bodhisattva worshipped in Esoteric Buddhism.

== Analysis ==
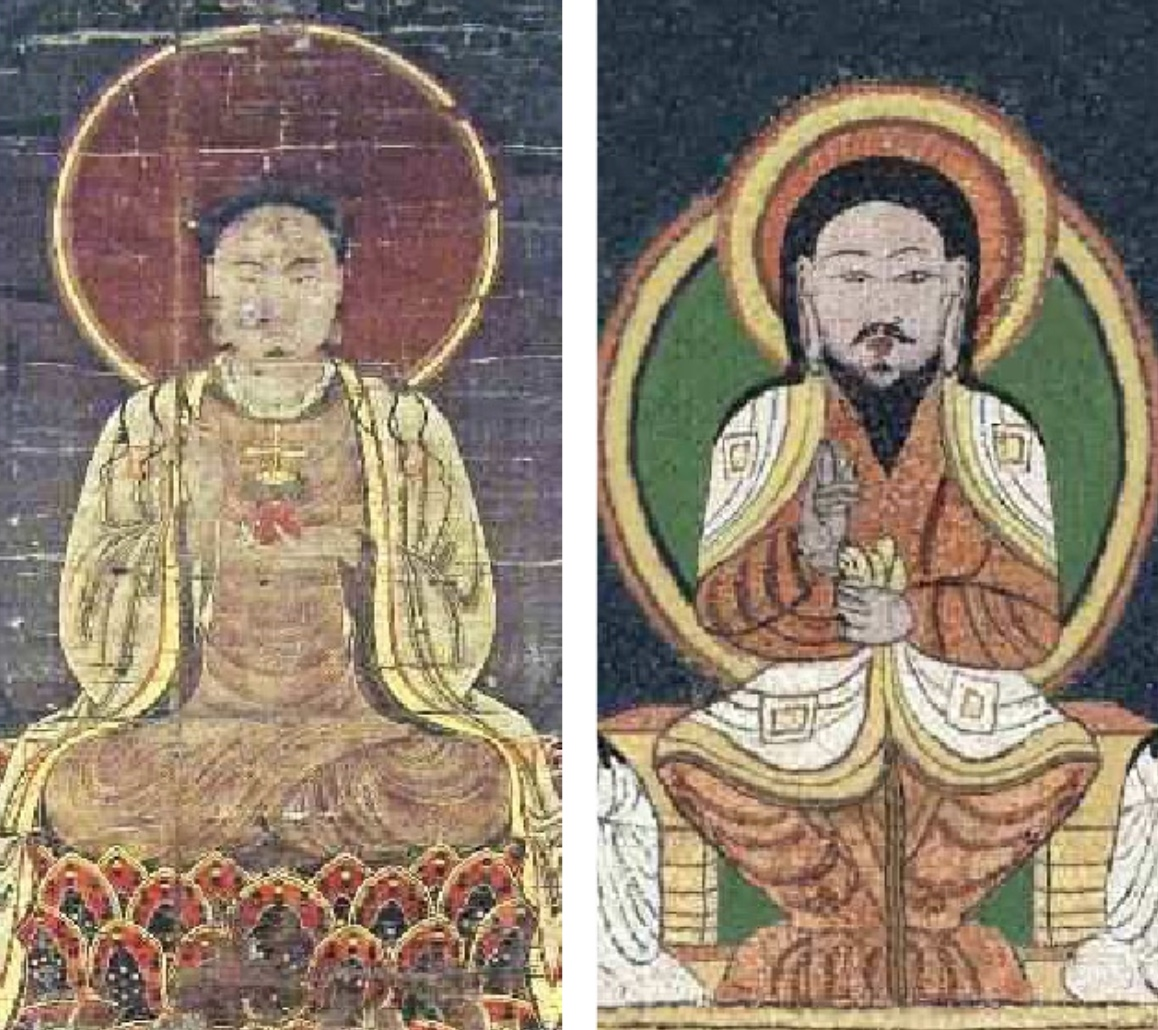
Left: Manichaean silk painting of the buddha Jesus from 13th-century southern China; right: enthroned Jesus image on a Manichaean temple banner from ca. 10th-century Qocho (East Central Asia). Points of comparison stated by Zsuzsanna Gulácsi: "1, red halo framed in red-gold-red bands; 2, long hair, moustache, beard, no headgear, loop beneath earlobe; 3, white cloak with gold border and four insignia; 4, red robe with folds in dark red shades covering the body; 5, right hand gesture showing two most distant fingers; 6, culturally distinct forms of prestigious sitting area."

The painting was identified earlier by the Japanese art historian Takeo Izumi as a Yuan dynasty Christian work of art. Zsuzsanna Gulácsi notes that the highly sinicised character of this painting weakens this idea, "since Nestorian Christianity in China maintained a foreign identity and produced art with relatively small degree of integration compared to the arts of other originally foreign but later fully integrated religions, such as Buddhism and Manichaeism."

After studying and comparing the scroll with a number of Buddhist, Church of the East Christian and Manichaean works of art, Gulácsi concluded in her article A Manichaean Portrait of the Buddha Jesus: Identifying a Twelfth-Thirteenth-century Chinese Painting from the Collection of Seiun-ji Zen Temple, that the painting is a Manichaean work of art:

Despite the fact that it features a figure seated on a lotus pedestal with a cross statuette in his left hand, this painting is neither a Buddhist nor a Christian work of art for three reasons: first, it can be linked with contemporaneous Chinese textual and visual sources that support its creation and used in a Manichaean context; second, it displays iconographic and compositional continuity with earlier Manichaean art; and third, it depicts a Manichaean subject (the prophet Jesus) with symbols that allude to two fundamental Manichaean teachings (Dualism and the Cross of Light) that are well documented throughout the history of this religion. Based on a contemporaneous inventory of paintings in the possession of a Manichaean temple in Wenzhou, this hanging scroll may be titled Yishu fo zhen (Silk Painting of the Buddha ["Prophet"] Jesus). Its attribution and identification help us to confirm that the Jesus subject had a long history in Manichaean devotional art, which now can be seen through two fragments from East Central Asia and a third, exquisitely well preserved, from southern China.

== Excursus ==
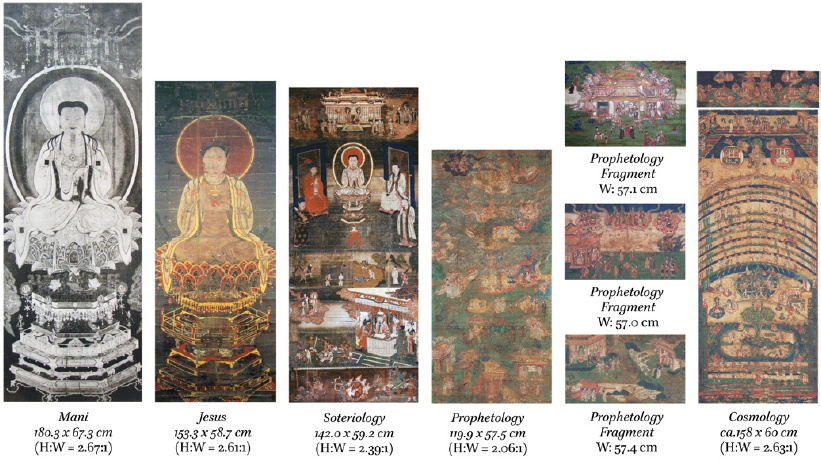
Eight Silk Painting Atlas

Eight silk hanging scrolls with Manichaean didactic images from southern China from between the 12th and the 15th centuries, which can be divided into four categories:

Two single portraits (depicting Mani and Jesus)

- Icon of Mani
- Manichaean Painting of the Buddha Jesus

One scroll depicting Salvation Theory (Soteriology)

- Sermon on Mani's Teaching of Salvation

Four scrolls depicting Prophetology (Prophetology)

- Mani's Parents
- Birth of Mani
- Episodes from Mani's Missionary Work
- Mani's Community Established

One scroll depicting Cosmology (Cosmology)

- Manichaean Diagram of the Universe

== See also ==
- Chinese Manichaeism
- Mogao Christian painting
