= Mani's Community Established =

Manichaen silk color painting

Legend of the Saint 2
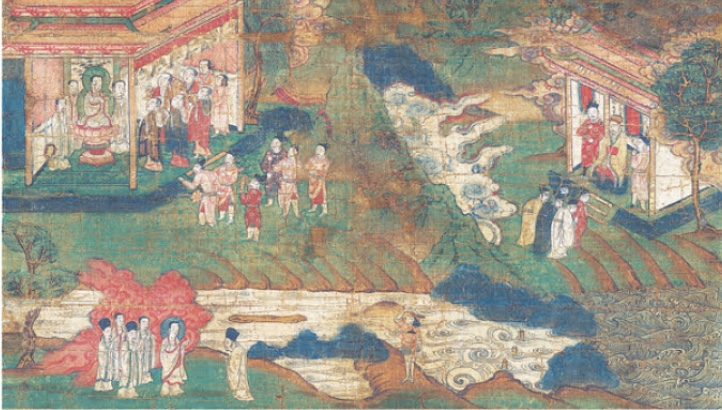
- Artist: Unknown
- Year: 14-15th century (late Yuan and early Ming)
- Type: Silk, ink and gold
- Dimensions: 32.9 cm × 57.4 cm (13.0 in × 22.6 in)
- Location: private collection; Japan

Mani's Community Established (Japanese: 圣者伝図2) is a Manichaen silk color painting drawn in the coastal area of southern China during the yuan to ming period, depicts the missionary history of Manichaeism and the establishment of its churches in three scenes. The preservation is intact and undamaged. This painting was originally part of a large Manichae silk painting, The drawing technique and artistic style are very similar to "Episodes from Mani's Missionary Work", "The Birth of Mani", "Mani's Parents" and "The Manichean Universe Map". The painting is now in a private collection in Japan.

In Japanese it is called Legend of the Saint 2 (圣者伝図2) with Episodes from Mani's Missionary Work being called Legend of the Saint 1 (圣者伝図1)

== Description ==
According to the research of the Hungarian Asian religious art historian Zsuzsanna Gulácsi, the content described in this work continues "The Legend of the Holy One", using a method similar to the current collage to present the follow-up missionary history and development of the Manichae Order after its establishment. History, the three scenes are separated by a pattern of clouds and mountains. The upper left picture depicts seven lay people worshiping in a Manichae shrine. Among them are five men, a woman and a child, offering offerings to a statue of Mani sitting on a lotus platform. This Mani statue is dressed in a white robe with red rims unique to Manichaeism, with a green headlight and backlight behind him. Three Manichaean priests in white robes stand on the left and right sides and behind the statue. There are three male musicians playing outside the shrine. On their right, there are three other men holding banners and canopies. It can be seen from this scene that the painting depicts the scene after the Mani church has been established. The statue of Mani shows that he is no longer alive and he has been worshipped as a god by believers.

The scene on the upper right is separated from the scene on the left by a green mountain range and a white cloud with sky blue. It depicts five Manichae laymen wearing green, red, yellow, blue, and white robes, bowing to a judge Greetings, showing their compliance with local laws.

The last scene is located at the bottom left, separated from the top left scene by a river of white clouds. It depicts a tutor wearing a red-rimmed white robe with a green head and four priests behind him. The five people encountered a layman bowing to them as they walked.

== Gallery ==
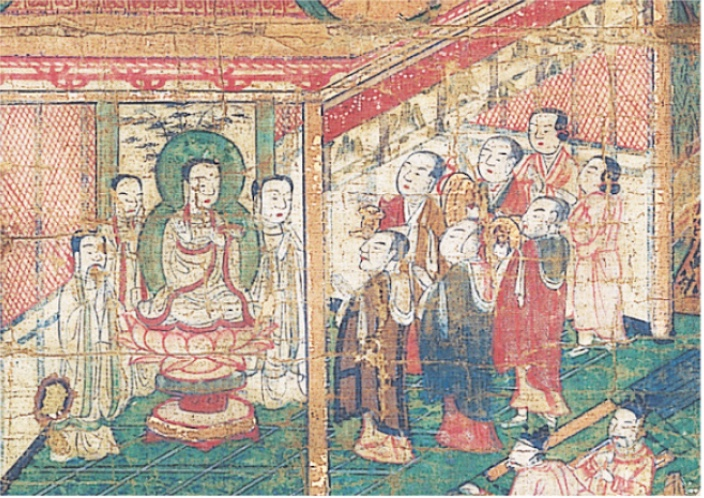
Seven lay believers worship in front of the Mani statue in the shrine

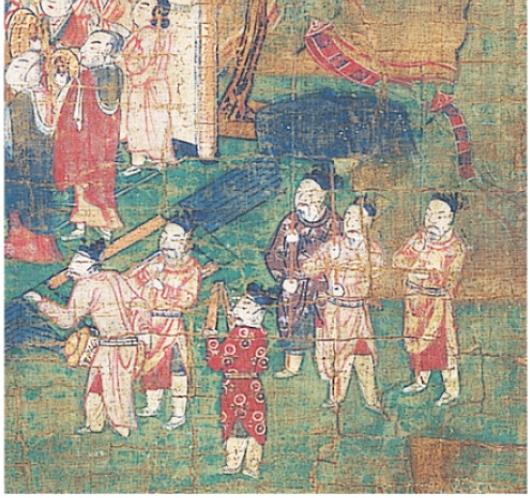
Mani's Community Established (Detail 2).jpg

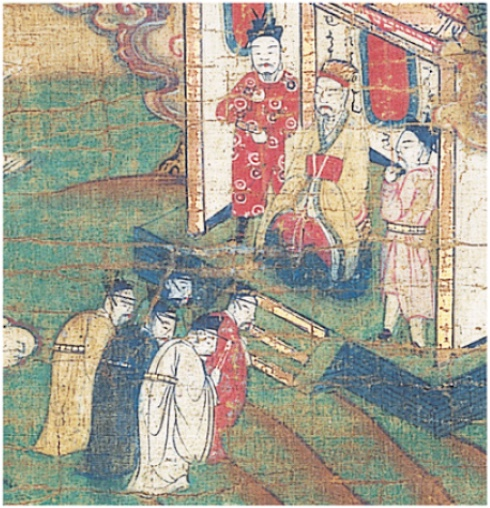
Five laity bows to a judge

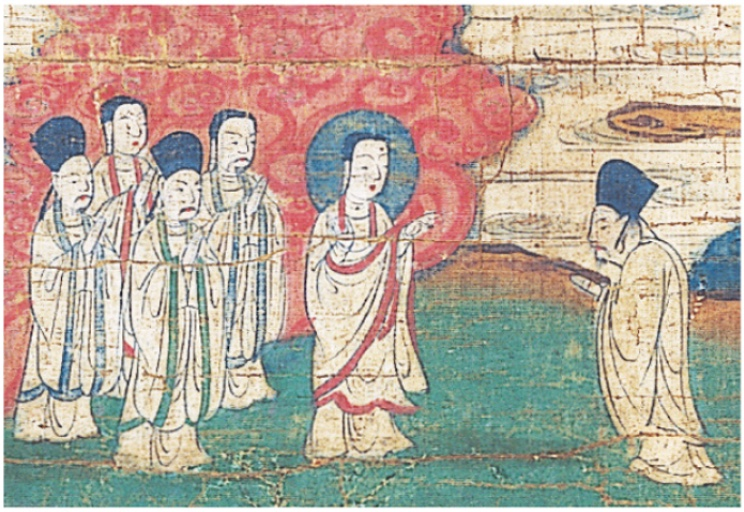
The mentor led four priests to meet a layman on the way

== Excursus ==
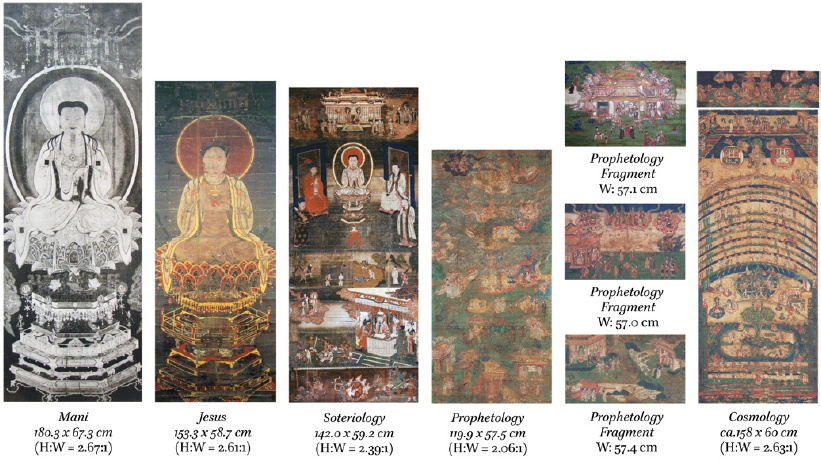
Eight Silk Painting Atlas

Eight silk hanging scrolls with Manichaean didactic images from southern China from between the 12th and the 15th centuries. They can be divided into four categories:

Two single portraits (depicting Mani and Jesus)

- Icon of Mani
- Manichaean Painting of the Buddha Jesus

One scroll depicting Salvation Theory (Soteriology)

- Sermon on Mani's Teaching of Salvation

Four scrolls depicting Prophetology (Prophetology)

- Mani's Parents
- Birth of Mani
- Episodes from Mani's Missionary Work
- Mani's Community Established

One scroll depicting Cosmology (Cosmology)

- Manichaean Diagram of the Universe
