= Zsuzsanna Gulácsi =

Hungarian-American historian

- Born: April 10, 1966 (age 60)
- Education: Indiana University Bloomington
- Occupation: art historian
- Employer: Northern Arizona University
- Awards: Guggenheim Fellowship

Zsuzsanna Gulácsi (born 10 April 1966) is a Hungarian-born American art historian of pan-Asiatic religions. Gulácsi is Professor of art history and Asian studies at Northern Arizona University (NAU). She is a specialist of Manichaean art, along with the artistic heritage of other Silk Road religions including Buddhism, East Syriac Christianity, Judaism, and Zoroastrianism. Her publications have given special attention to the medium of the illuminated book in the Manichaean, Syriac and Armenian traditions, including the identification of Diatessaron-based cycles of scenes from the life of Christ in both Christian and Manichaean codices, as well as other shared codicological and illumination practices. Gulácsi identified the earliest Manichaean work of art known today—a rock crystal sealstone of Mani (3rd century CE), and one of the last surviving Manichaean works of art from 12th/13th-century southern China—a silk Manichaean Painting of the Buddha Jesus. Her introduction of digital imaging technology to research on the highly fragmentary remains of Uygur Manichaean art yielded the first digital restorations of paintings from 9th/10th century Kocho in order to bring out the preserved, but otherwise hard-to-see, iconographic content. Her recent work compares funerary art among Manichaean, Buddhist, and Zoroastrian communities of the eastern Silk Road.

== Career ==
With a background in historical ethnography and Turkology, Gulácsi pursued a postgraduate education in Central Eurasian Studies and Art History, receiving a double major PhD degree in these fields in 1998 from Indiana University Bloomington. From 1999 to 2003, she taught history of Central Asian art at Sophia University in Tokyo, Japan. She then joined the faculty of the Department of Humanities, Arts, and Religion at NAU in 2003. She has published a number of articles and books. She was awarded the Guggenheim Fellowship for Humanities in 2016. In 2017, she was invited by Frantz Grenet as a guest lecturer at Collège de France.

== Awards ==
- Institute for Advanced Study Scholar
- Getty Residential Scholar
- Guggenheim Fellowship for Humanities
- Ryskamp Research Fellow
- National Humanities Center Fellow

== Selected publications ==
- Manichaean Art in Berlin Collections, "Corpus Fontium Manichaeorum: Series Archaeologica et Iconographica" (vol. 1). Turnhout: Brepols Publishers, 2001
- Mediaeval Manichaean Book Art: A Codicological Study of Iranian and Turkic Illuminated Book Fragments from 8th-11th Century East Central Asia, "Nag Hammadi and Manichaean Studies" series (vol. 57). Leiden: Brill Publishers, 2005
- Mani's Pictures: The Didactic Images of the Manichaeans from Sasanian Mesopotamia to Uygur Central Asia and Tang-Ming China, "Nag Hammadi and Manichaean Studies" series (vol. 90). Leiden: Brill Publishers, 2015

== See also ==
- Manichaean Diagram of the Universe
- Manichaean Painting of the Buddha Jesus
- Sermon on Mani's Teaching of Salvation
