= Seiunji Temple =

Temple

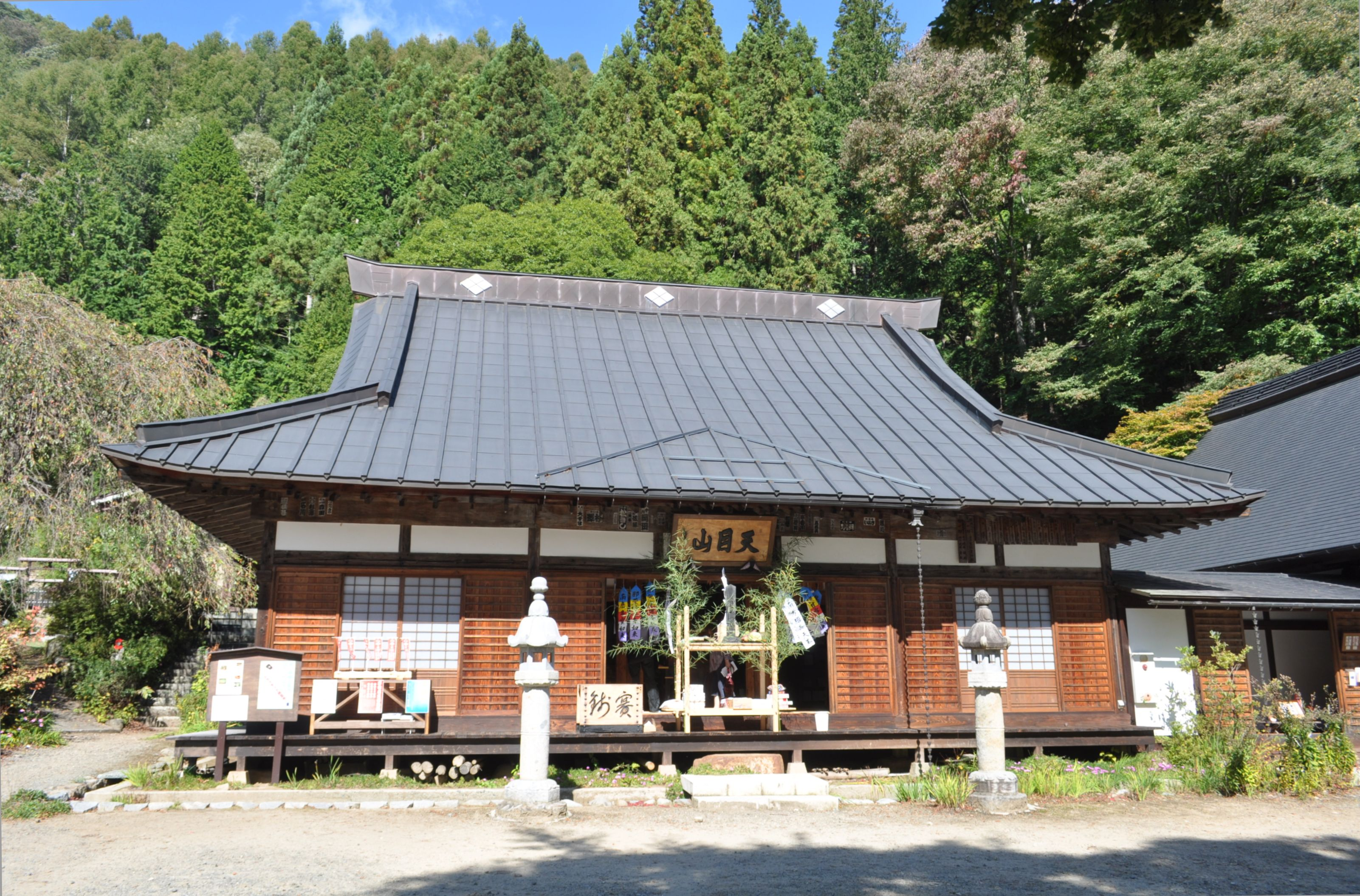

- Location within Japan Location within Asia Location within Earth

Religion
- Affiliation: Buddhism
- Deity: Shaka Nyorai

Location
- Country: Japan
- Interactive map of Seiunji Temple
- Coordinates: 35°39′38.2″N 138°48′38.4″E

Architecture
- Founder: Nariumi Honjo
- Established: c.1348
- Completed: Jōwa 4th year / Shohei 3rd year (1348)

Website
- www.tenmokusan.or.jp

Seiunji ( Seiunji, Seiunji) is a temple in Yamato-cho, Kisai, Koshu City, Yamanashi Prefecture. It is a Kenchoji sect temple of the Rinzai school, with the mountain name of Tenmokuzan and the Honzon of Shakyamuni Buddha. At the time of its founding, the temple was called Gokoku Zenji.

== Overview ==
Seiunji Temple is located on the left bank of the upper reaches of the Nichikawa valley at an elevation of about 1,050 meters in the Tenmokuzan mountains. In Tano, another 4.6 km downstream of the Nichigawa valley, there is a Soto Zen temple, Tenmokuzan Keitokuin.

In 1348, the founder Gokkai Honjo (also known as Gokkai, 1284–1352) visited this mountain, which was then called 1284–1352) visited this mountain, which was called Mount Tokusayama In the second year of Bunpo (1318), Narihumi and five of his companions traveled to The Yuan Dynasty, where they received teachings and the Inka from the Buddhist master Zhongfeng Mingben (1263-1323) at Tianmu Mountain. He returned to Japan in 1326. After that, he traveled around the country for more than 20 years in search of a suitable place to practice the teachings of his master.

Gokkai strongly criticized the Muso Soseki sect, which was predominant at the time. He left behind a legend that he enshrined a statue of Pu'o Kokushi in a rock cave, sat in meditation under a tree, rarely interacted with the local people. After his death four years later, Mokuzai-san prospered under the patronage of the Takeda clan, the protector of Kai, and Mokuzai-san came to be known as "Tenmoku-san," and together with Zuiganzan Kogenji Temple in Tanba City, Hyogo Prefecture (whose founder, Tohkei Zuo, was one of those who traveled with Gyohai Honjo to Gen), it was also called "Higashi Tenmoku" and "Nishi Tenmoku.

In Onei 23 (1416), Takeda Nobumitsu, the protector of Kai, who was defeated by the Muromachi Shogunate for his complicity in the Uesugi Zenshu Rebellion, committed suicide in this mountain. The remains of Nobumitsu are said to have been brought to this temple for burial, and the Hokyointo of Nobumitsu and the Gorintō of his vassals who committed suicide together exist in Seiunji Temple. It is said that Takeda Shingen also dedicated a military flag, a Gunbai, and a mirror to the temple.

At the end of the Warring States Period, Tokugawa Ieyasu, who destroyed the Takeda clan, also issued a guarantee of about three kanbun of temple territory and three articles of prohibition to the temple, 1583 June 20. In addition, in 1643, the temple received a Shuin-jō from Ieyasu's grandson, the third shogun Tokugawa Iemitsu of the Edo shogunate, for the relief of the temple territory. In 1716, the Shuin-jō land according to the surveybook is said to have been about 20 koku.

There is water from the two lakes in the mountains of Mitsugu Terano. Mikakawano Ran Nishite Mizuki Rel Tokoya. Name Zukete Mikakawa Here is the right place. This is a landslide stop for the old landslides. The current meditation of the meditation, the deceased person's call, the meditation of the deceased, the meditation of the meditation, the meditation of the west bank, the meditation of the meditation, and the meditation of the meditation. Bunna Yang Water Dragon On July 27th, the teacher was lonely. A student, Nieiris in the northwest corner of the temple. Tower lantern toy. Takeda Nobushige, Ono no Michikaze, mourning the temple, building a small hall of fame, donating too many permanent production areas, and opening the temple. Nobumitsu's misfortune Nishite Hisashi Nina Sumi, a good doctor, and a graduate of Kusmo. The so-called "U". It is necessary to have a suicide job, Mt. Tenmoku, in front of the Buddhist altar. Healing recovery wo profit Zareba secret suicide sen. Immediately, the rank of the decree, Daisuke Nobushige, Shan Rang, Mt. This is the so-called horsetail horsetail.

— Excerpt from "Takeda Nobumitsu and Seiunji" by Yoshiyuki Komeichi, August 2010

According to the writings of Zen master Nariumi Honjo, there was a lake in the upper part of Mount Mokuzai, which overflowed during rainfall and flowed down the slope, and the present garden (stone garden) may have been created as a result of this. Takeda Nobumitsu was said to have been very ill and committed suicide because he was involved in the Uesugi Zen sect's rebellion.

== History ==
- 1348 - Founded by Nariumi Honjo as the founder of the temple.
- 1359 - It is said that a bronze bell was cast by Shami Dogane.
- 1417 - Takeda Nobumitsu, the 13th head of the Takeda clan, the Kai protector, committed suicide on Mt.
- 1583 - Tokugawa Ieyasu issued a guarantee of 3 kanbun of temple territory and 3 articles of prohibition.
- 1592 - The temple was burned down by the Oda family, but the treasury was rebuilt that year.
- 2010 - "Void Bodhisattva", exhibited at the Metropolitan Museum of Art, New York City
- October 2, 2016 - "Tenmokuzan Seiunji Temple: Takeda Nobumitsu Lord Six Hundredth Anniversary Memorial Service" Buddhist memorial service was held.

== The temple complex ==
- Main hall
- Koryu
- Sanno Shrine Main Hall
- Bronze Bell
- Dento-an
- Ishiwa Kaikan
- Tenmoku District Assembly Hall

== Cultural Properties ==
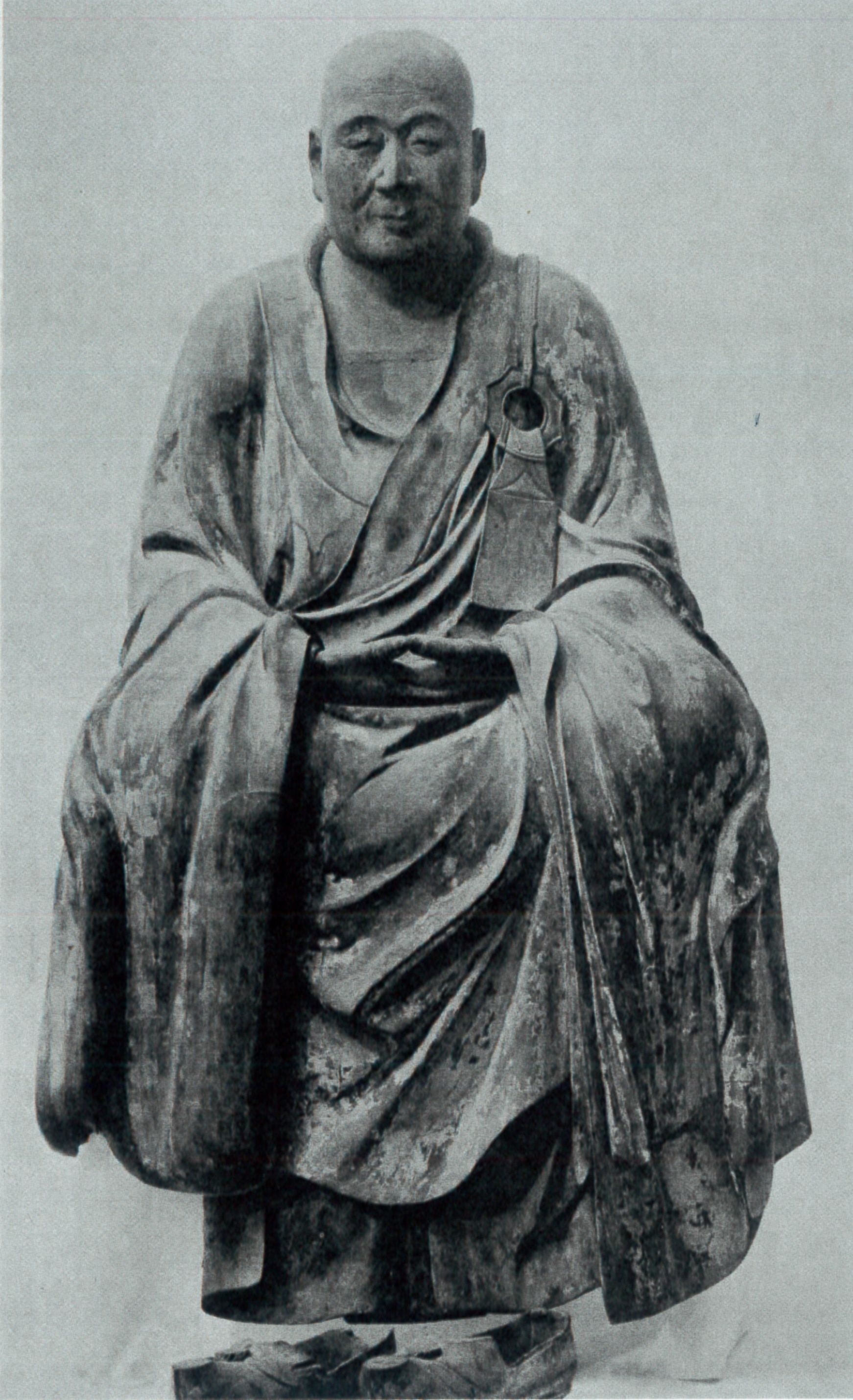
Important Cultural Property (National Designation) of Seated Master Fuo Kunishi

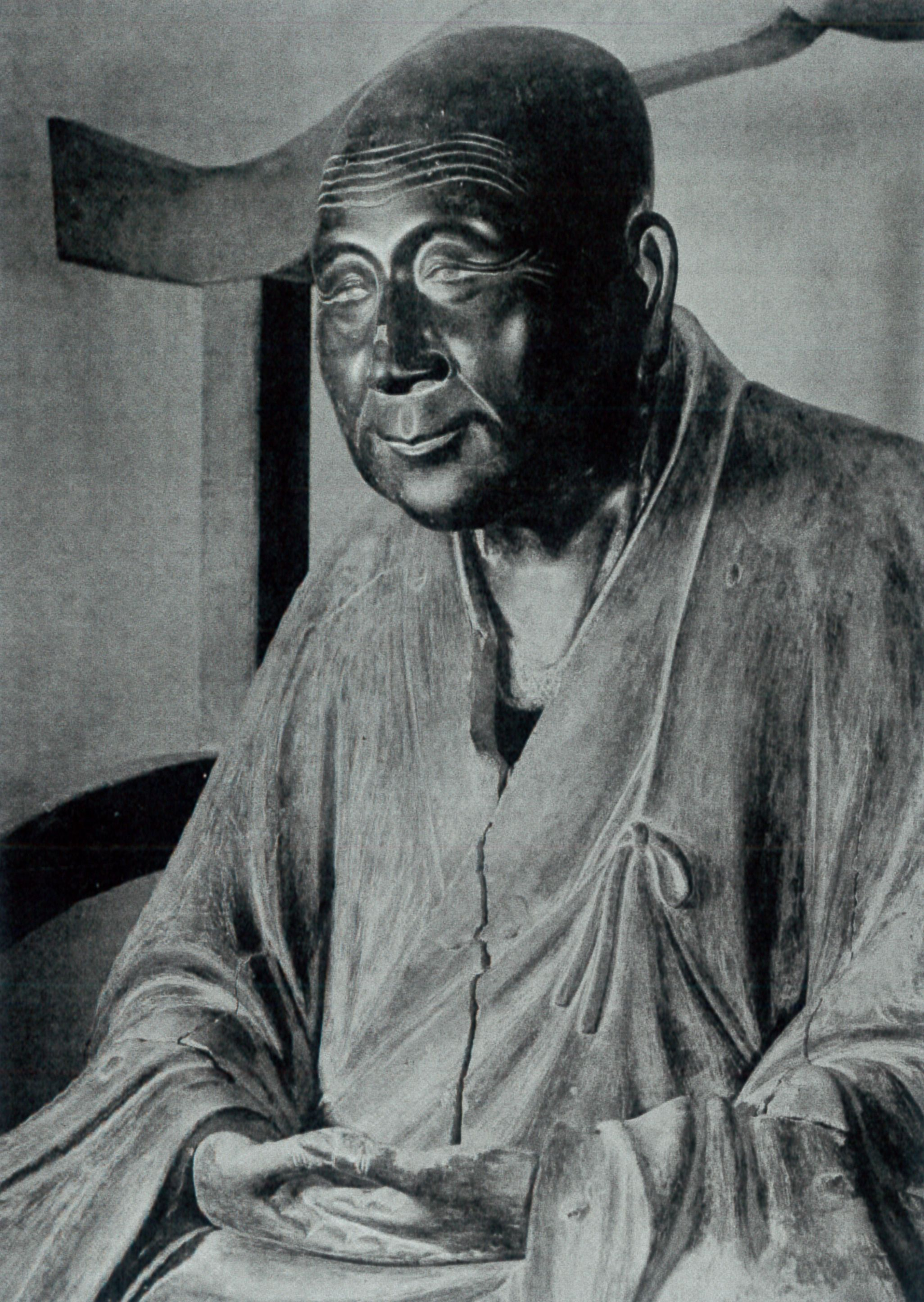
Seating image of Gyohai Honjo, a prefectural tangible cultural property

=== Important Cultural Property (National Designation) ===
- Wooden Seated Statue of Pu'o Guo Shi - Designated on June 22, 1971

Fuo Guo Shi was a high priest of the Yuan dynasty in China and the founder of the Gensyu school of the Rinzai sect, Chufeng Mingben. He was known as a solitary recluse, and many Zen monks from Japan have returned to Japan after visiting him and receiving his teachings, including Gyohai Honjo, the founder of Tenmokuzan Seiunji Temple. He was known for his strict Zen style and influenced the Zen forests in Japan during this period. The wooden statue of Pu'ou Kokushi is a carving of him with his hair shaved, wearing a kesa over his robe, and sitting on his stomach with a Zen meditation seal. The statue is made of marquetry of Japanese cypress and is decorated with jade eyes, but most of the color has been removed. There is an inscription in red ink on the inner neck of the statue, indicating that the statue was created in 1353 by Buddhist masters Hogen Inko and Hohashi Inzun. They are also the creators of the seated statue of Shaka Nyorai, the main deity of Kounji Temple.

=== Tangible Cultural Property designated by the prefecture ===
- Wooden Seated Statue of Gyohai Honjo (Sculpture) - Designated on November 7, 1960

In 1318, Gyohae traveled to Yuan in Wenpo 2, studied under Master Pu'ou at Tenmoku Mountain in Hangzhou, and established Tenmoku Mountain Seiunji upon his return. After returning to Japan, he established Tenmoku-zan Qingyunji Temple, which is also called "East Tenmoku," in contrast to Tamba Saji, which was established by Tohjian Seo, who returned to Japan with Gyoukai, and is called "West Tenmoku. Nariumi stayed in the mountains and led a hard life of Zen meditation day and night, following his master's secluded nature and the philosophy of Zen unity, until he died on July 27, 1352. The statue is made of marquetry and is a colored carving of the head of a Buddhist monk. It is made of marquetry and has a height of 61.0 cm, and on the inner surface of the pivot is inked the inscription "Shogun's Grand Buddhist Priest Hakuro Hoken Kei", which indicates that this statue was made just after the death of Gyohai.

- Wooden Seated Statue of Shakyamuni Buddha (Sculpture, Main Image) - Designated on April 8, 1971, The wooden Seated Shakyamuni Buddha Statue is a seated statue of a crowned Shakyamuni (Kegon Shakyamuni). The statue of Shakyamuni Buddha wearing a crown and chest ornaments looks like a Bodhisattva. Since the Middle Ages, the crowned Buddha has been enshrined in Zen temples as the principal image. The figure is made of marquetry of Japanese cypress, with colored eyes, and stands 62.0 cm tall.
- Manichaean Painting of the Buddha Jesus - Designated on July 11, 2013. Colored on silk. The dimensions are 153.3 cm (length) and 58.7 cm (width), and it was made during the Yuan dynasty (13th and 14th centuries) in China. Deposited in the Yamanashi Prefectural Museum by the Deposit. It depicts a statue of a single deity pierced by a gorgeous hexagonal multiple lotus seat and equipped with head and body lights. The statue is topped by a canopy. He wears a white outer robe trimmed in gold and red over a light purple inner robe, with several strands of hair hanging down over his left and right shoulders. On the sides of the outer robe and at the knees are four square inscriptions, and within the square frame is the head of a person wearing a crown. Both hands are placed in front of the chest, with the right hand held in the shape of a fear of death and the left hand holding a cross. The painting has the characteristics of Chinese Yuan dynasty Buddhist paintings, such as the careful depiction of the flesh and body, the folds and undulations of the clothing, the use of gold and mud, and the structure of the painted silk. The box inscription on this painting says that it is a statue of Emptiness, so it has long been considered to be a statue of Emptiness. In 2013, it was published in Yamanashi under the name of "Mani holding a cross" in accordance with the new theory mentioned below. In 2013, it was designated as a cultural property of Yamanashi Prefecture under the name of "Mani statue dedicated to the cross" based on the new theory mentioned below. In 2013, the statue was designated as a cultural property of Yamanashi Prefecture under the name of "Mani statue dedicated to the cross", in accordance with a new theory mentioned below. There are two theories about its origin: one is that it was brought to the temple by Gyohai Honjo, the founder of Seiunji Temple, and the other is that it belonged to Arima Harunobu, a Christian feudal lord who died in the temple. The latter theory is more plausible, as there is little necessity for Nariumi Honjo to have brought in the main image with the cross.

At first glance, this statue looks like a Buddhist painting, but there are various theories about the dignity of this statue, as it has different expressions from Buddhist paintings, such as a cross on the handle. There are several theories about the dignity of the statue, since the cross on the armor is a Greek cross that has been transformed into a Chinese style, suggesting that it is a Nestorian Christian (Jing) holy statue that was spread in the Jiangnan region. Supplemented and collected in "Dignified Expression in Buddhist Painting", Chuokoron Bijutsu Shuppan, October 2010, ISBN 978-4-8055-0635-6. The white upper garment with gold and red borders and the seal-shaped ornaments depicting the upper part of the figure on the chest and both sides of the knees represent the head of the "Maiden of Light" in Manichaean mythology. Manichaean paintings in the Daiwa Bunkakan collection and the Manichaean statue of Jesus in Chuanan in Senshu. It is difficult to judge from the external appearance, since several foreign religions seemed to be trying to keep their faith alive in Jiangnan at that time, mixing syncretism with Buddhism and Taoism. At present, it is difficult to imagine that Jingism, a powerful sect in the Yuan dynasty, would go to the trouble of creating a statue that resembles a Buddhist painting, and it is also unclear whether Jingism had the custom of painting portraits of Jesus. However, Manichaeism, which was persecuted, has the probability of mimicking Buddhist paintings, and Jesus is also an object of worship in Manichaeism. In the case of Manichaeism, where Jesus was persecuted, there is a probability that it mimics Buddhist paintings, and since Jesus is an object of worship in Manichaeism as well, it is plausible that this painting is an image of Jesus in Manichaeism

- Hokyoin-to (Japanese pagoda) (building) - designated June 19, 1958. The body of the pagoda is plain, not wrapped around the outline as in the Kanto style, and has the inscription "Fudoto" on the front and "Bunwa Kii Mikitoshi Jiko Arbitrary Date Erected" on the back. The age of the pagoda is the second year of Bunwa (1353). The stone is quartz diorite, and the total height is 1.84 meters. It is a rare Kansai-style Hokyoin-to (a Japanese pagoda) in Kai, and it is a valuable relic showing the characteristics of the late Kamakura period. In addition, "Fudoto" is also called "Kaikai-to", which is a toba built in Zen Buddhism temples to bury the remains of sentient monks.
- Hokyointo (Pagoda of the Founder of Seiunji Temple) (Architectural Monument) - Designated on January 27, 1972. This "Founder's Pagoda," inscribed in July 1352, is presumed to have been built by the temple's second chief priest, Muuninogen, who was Gyohae's legal heir. The stone is made of quartz andesite, and the present height is 1.45m. This pagoda is a variant of Kanto style Hokyoin-tou. The juxtaposition of these two remains, which are the oldest in the prefecture with different styles from Kansai and Kanto, is very valuable.
- Copper Bell (Artifact) - Designated on February 9, 1959, This bell is one of the "Five Bells of Kai", together with the Kuonji bell (Minobu-cho), the Ichinomiya-cho bell, the Houkouji bell (Koshu City), and the Eishouin bell (Yamanashi City). It is one of the Five Bells of Kai. "According to the inscription on the Pond Room, it was built in Enbun 4 (1359), only 11 years after Teiwa 4 (1348), when Seiunji Temple was opened, by the carpenter Shami Michikin. The inscription reads, "Danna Shami Michirin Mikien Higa no Gen," which is thought to be the Buddhist name of Izu no Mamoru Nobutake, who is said to be the founder of the Takeda family, and was built by the second abbot of Seiunji Temple, Muji no Gen. There is a tradition that this bell was used as a battle bell.
- Seiunji Garden (place of scenic beauty) - designated on March 31, 1979

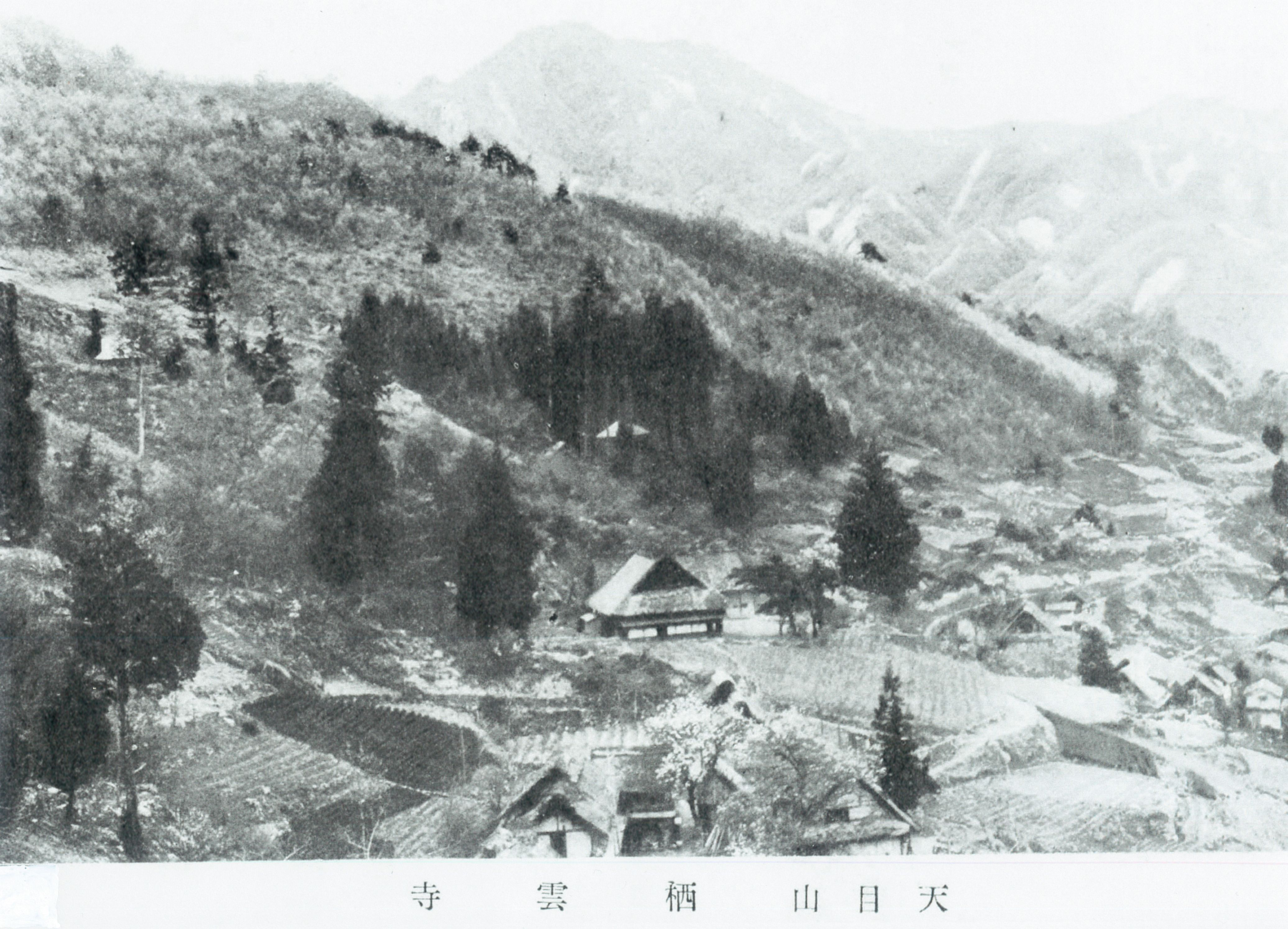
Overall view of Tenmoku-san Seiunji Temple in the early Showa period

The garden is a 1.413-hectare area of granodiorite on a steep slope behind the storehouse, built of overlapping huge rocks that follow the topography of the valley. The garden is said to have been created by Kaizan Gyohae, as evidenced by the year inscribed on the rocks. It is not a mere garden, but a sacred place where one can practice Zen meditation, and is a uniquely Japanese Zen garden. It is a unique Japanese Zen garden, with the words "Reihseoksenn" (sacred stone spring) engraved on a huge rock, and the rubbings of the year and the name of the stonecutter on both sides, "Doseishi engraved", which was engraved by Doseishi in 1353

Koji Ohara "Restoration of Seiunji Temple in Tenmeyama"

The grandeur of the scale is as seen by the author's amateur eyes, but when it comes to how to set up such rocks, no one can see it. At that time, there was no power or heavy machinery, it was just unimaginable, and there should have been no way to set a huge rock or move a large stone, but it is a big mystery. "The focus of the Zen Master is the power of water. If you wash away the earth and sand on the slope by dropping a large amount of water from the top of the mountain, large rocks in the soil will be exposed. There are stones that can be moved by human power. I tried to stabilize it by chewing. It is a natural reason and power to flow below the high water. It is said that the stonework should have been realized as it flows down. A vivid mystery. The solution is to discover and demonstrate the traces of the headrace on the mountain. "

— Excerpt from November 2000 in memory of "Rare Gardener" Koji Ohara "" by Wuwei Iibukuro

- Jizo Bodhisattva (carving) - Designated December 12, 1968, some are carved in the flesh, while others are carved in lines. In Japan, the Usuki, Oya, and the Shimoyamaka in Nara Prefecture are prominent, but the number of Magaibutsu is smaller than other single stone Buddhas. To the east of the storehouse, two cliff Buddhas can be seen, and this Jizo Bosatsu cliff Buddha is one of them. This Jizo Bosatsu Buddha is one of them. It is a 70 cm high statue carved on a huge rock. The statue was carved on the shore of a hard granodiorite rock, which is easily weathered, and was able to withstand 600 years of weathering. The statue of Jizo Bosatsu (Jizo Bodhisattva), carved at this time, has a pioneering significance for the Jizo faith in Japan and is rare in the prefecture.
- Manjushri Boddhisattva Mogae Buddha (sculpture) - Designated on March 31, 1977

Like the statue of Jizo Bosatsu, this statue is said to have been created by Gyohai Honjo, the founder of the temple, and is carved in a thin, almost linear style on a huge, 4.5m wide and 3.0m high vertical bank of granodiorite. The total height of the statue is 90cm, the edge of the robe 70cm, and the diameter of the halo of the head of the circular phase 40cm. Monju Bodhisattva is said to be not only wise, but also pure and unattached like a child, and is often depicted as a child. This statue is reminiscent of "Monju the Younger". The figure of Monju the Younger, carved with its face halfway to the left, is a Buddha with high artistic value.

- Koryu (building) of Seiunji Temple - Designated on June 22, 1995, According to the "Reconstruction of the Hall", the temple was rebuilt in the first year of Bunroku (1592). The treasury was dismantled and reconstructed between 1996 and 2001, restoring it to its former glory. Facing the south on the east side of the main hall, it is a single-story gabled roof with a copper plate roof. The construction of the kōri is dated to the first year of the Bunroku era (1688-1704), according to the "reconstruction schedule". It is valuable as the origin of the Koshu Minka.
- Kujyo Kesa (Artifact) - Designated on September 6, 1993. This is a nine-jointed kesa, which is said to be a traditional Buddhist robe given to Narihito by his master, Nakamimoto (Fudeokokuji). The kesa is narrow in the center and wider on both sides, a shape unique to Zen Buddhism, with the left end measuring 130.0 cm, the center 92.0 cm, and the right end 108.0 cm. Judging from the expression of the gold maki-e arabesque patterns on the links attached to the kesa, it is thought that the kesa was sewn at the same time as the links during the Northern and Southern Dynasties, or that it was sewn in China and only the links were attached in Japan. It is a miracle that this kujō kesa, which dates back to the Nanbokucho period, has been preserved to the present day, hundreds of years after its creation.
- Tokoname jar excavated from Kaizan tomb (archaeological material) - Designated on April 26, 2007. This jar was found as a fragment from underneath Hokyointo (a Japanese pagoda). It is a Tokonameyaki jar with dimensions of 68.3 cm in height, 19.0 cm in base diameter, 42.3 cm in diameter, and 66.2 cm in maximum shoulder diameter. There are four stamps of "Ten" on its shoulders. The name "Kan'o Jinjin" in the inscription of the Hokyoin-tou (a pagoda built in the year 1352) is thought to be Gyohai's bone collection, since it is the year of his death. 1353 built in 1353) (see Ikunji website).

=== Tangible cultural property designated by the city ===
- Takeda Nobumitsu's tomb (historical site) - designated on October 2, 1973.
- Main hall of Seiunji Temple (building) - designated on December 25, 1997
- Main Hall of Sanno Shrine (structure) - designated on July 14, 1993
- Image of Vajrasattva (painting) - designated on October 5, 1982
- Lord Shingen Gunbai (artifact) - designated on October 5, 1982
- Takeda Military Banner (Artifact) - Designated on October 5, 1982.
- Shingen Koujin Kagami (Artifact) - Designated on December 10, 1982.
- Myochi mirror (artifact) - designated on February 14, 1983.
- Rabbit Paperweight (Artifact) - Designated on December 10, 1982.
- Image of Takeda 24 Generals (painting) - Designated on December 10, 1982
- Jug (artifact) - designated on February 14, 1983
- Large Crystal Bead (Artifact) - Designated on December 10, 1982
- Dragon Beard Brush (Craft) - Designated on February 14, 1983.
- Tenmoku Tea Bowl (artifact) - designated on March 14, 1983.
- Cloisonne Incense Burner (Artifact) - Designated on July 14, 1993.
- Engraving by Nariumi (calligraphy) - Designated on July 14, 1993
- Morality Verses of Ngariumi (Calligraphy) - Designated on July 14, 1993
- Image of Marishiten (painting) - Designated on July 14, 1993
- Gofuda woodblock (painting) from the Tempou era - Designated on July 14, 1993
- Nirvana of Buddha (painting) - Designated on July 14, 1993.

=== Holding of the exhibition of wind vases for treasures of Seiunji Temple ===
Held every year in mid-November (for two days on Saturday and Sunday), this is a special annual exhibition of the treasures of Seiunji Temple (Buddhist statues, paintings, crafts, etc.) that are not normally seen.

- Organized by - Tenmoku-zan Seiunji Temple
- Supported by - Cultural Properties Division, Koshu City Board of Education
- Venue - Seiunji Main Hall, Dentoan and Assembly Hall
- Hours - 9:00 a.m. - 3:00 p.m.
- Admission - Adults 500 yen, Students 300 yen

== Transportation ==
- Train - JRChuo Line - get off at Kai-Yamato Station and take a local bus.
- Bus - Koshu City Citizen Bus bound for Amame (Seiunji) on the Koshu City (Shioyama, Katsunuma, Yamato) Longitudinal Line - Get off at the Amame (Seiunji) stop and walk 3 minutes.

== Gallery ==
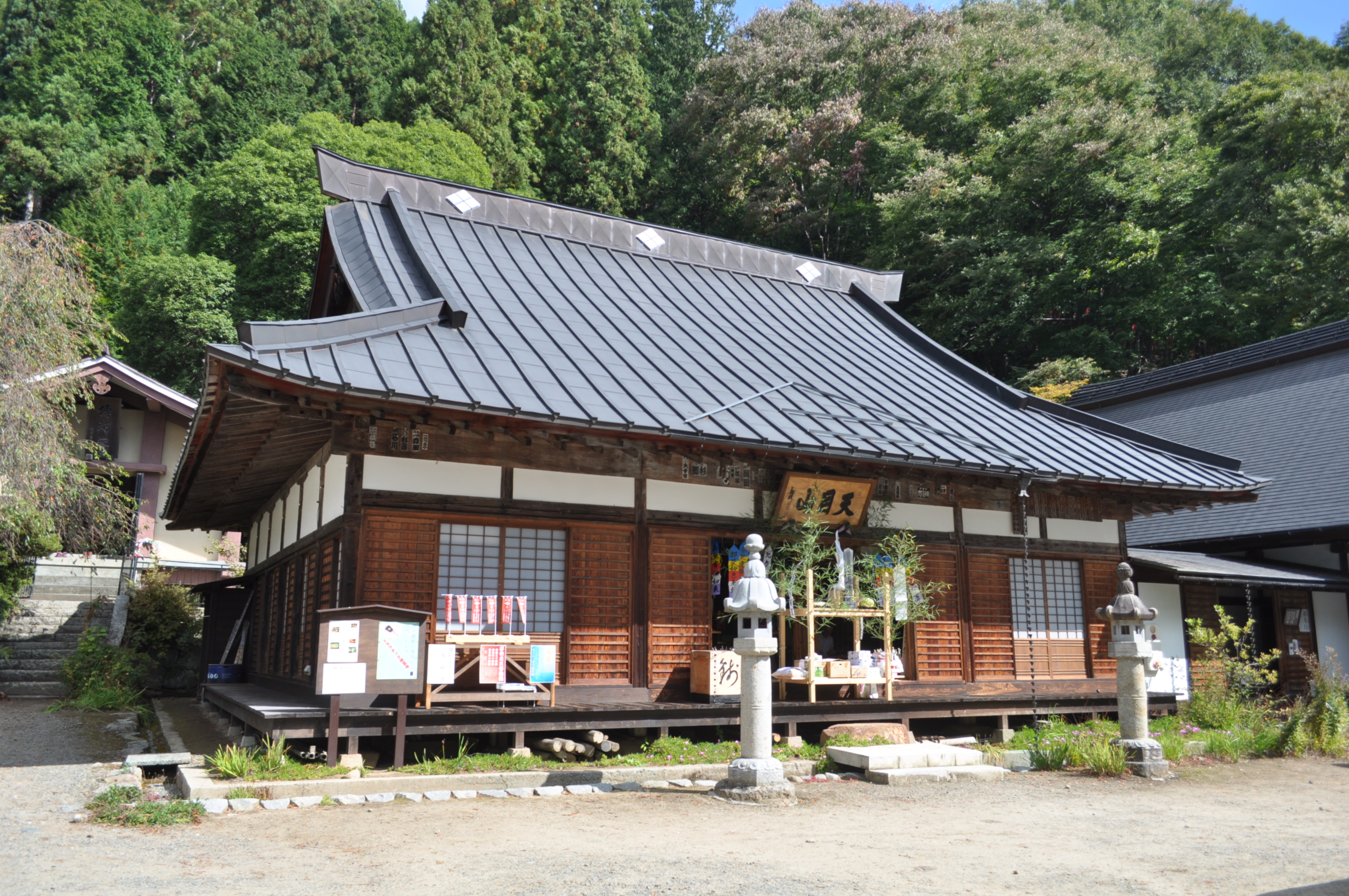
The main hall seen from the southwest (City-designated tangible cultural property, taken on October 9, 2017)

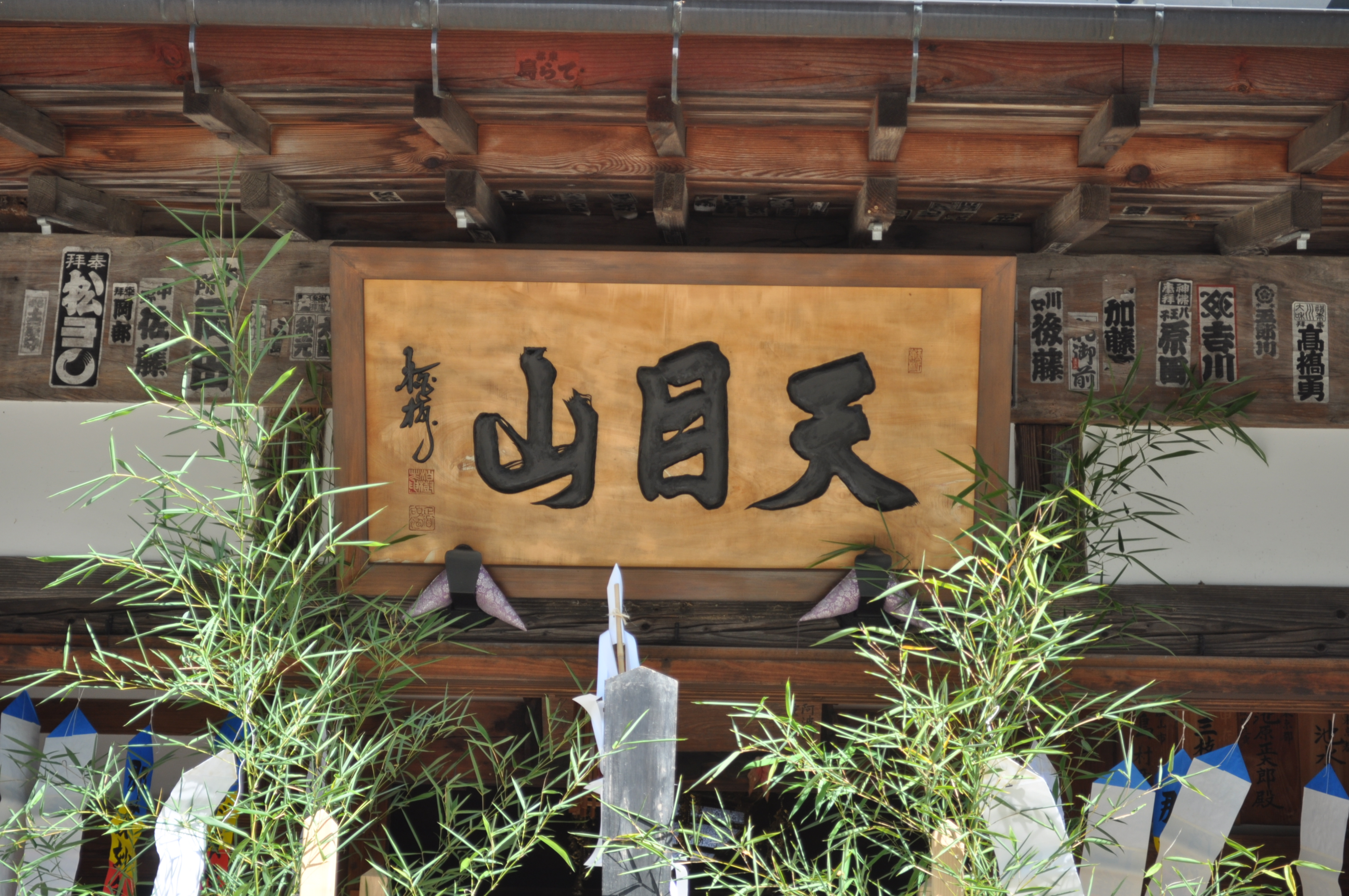
Front of the main hall (taken on October 9, 2017)

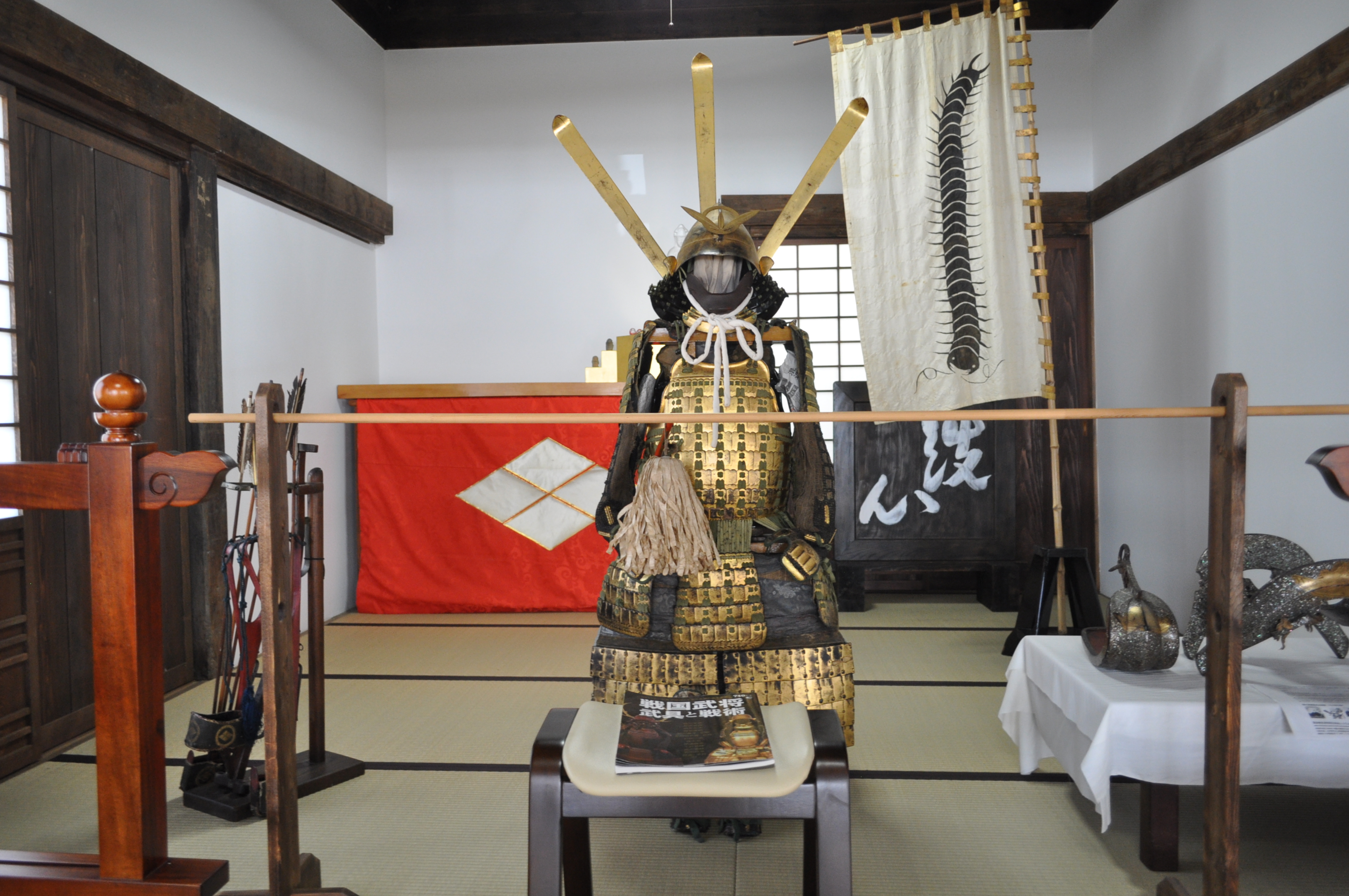
Armor in the main hall (taken on October 9, 2017)

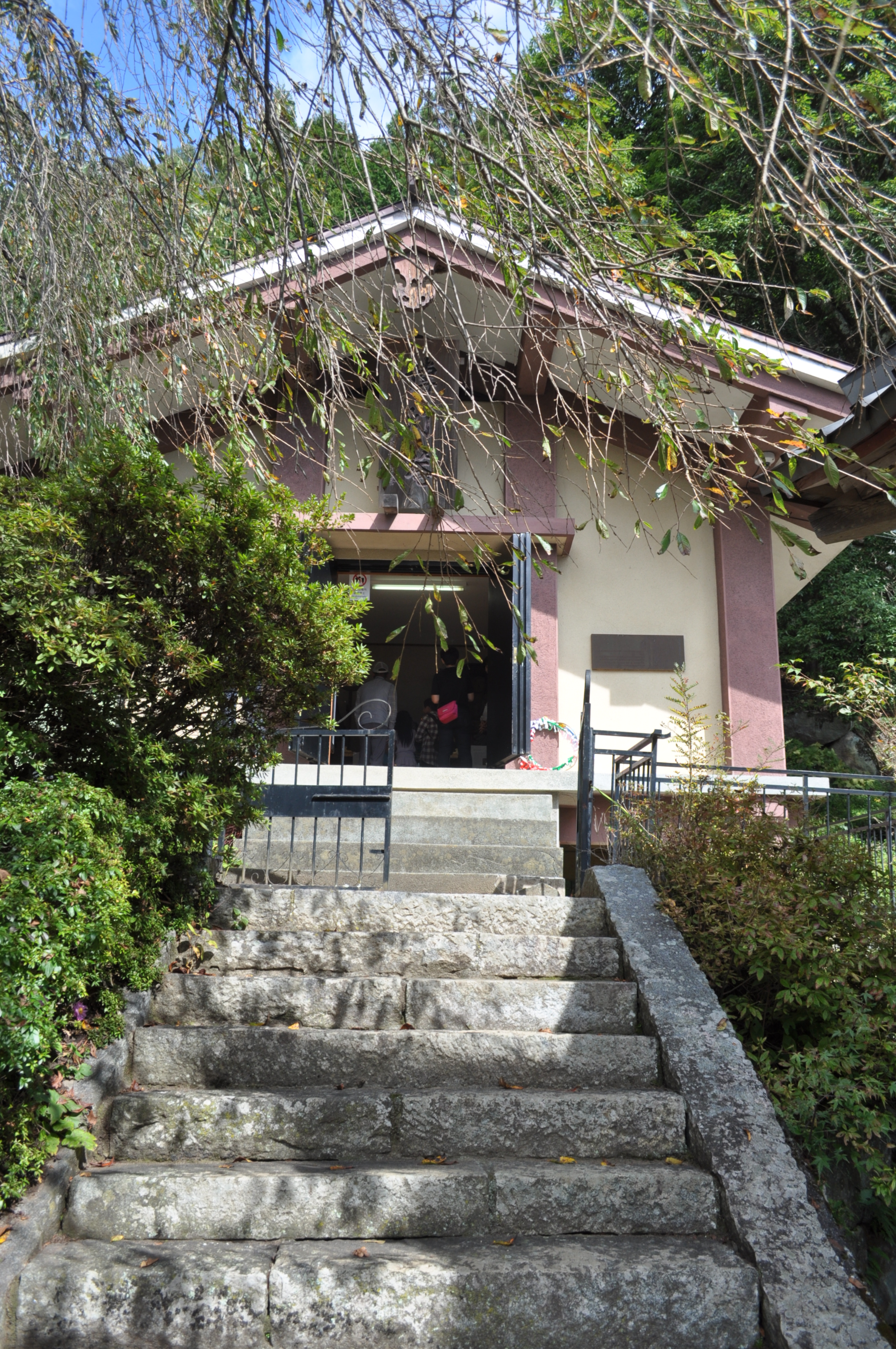
Dentouan (taken on October 9, 2017)

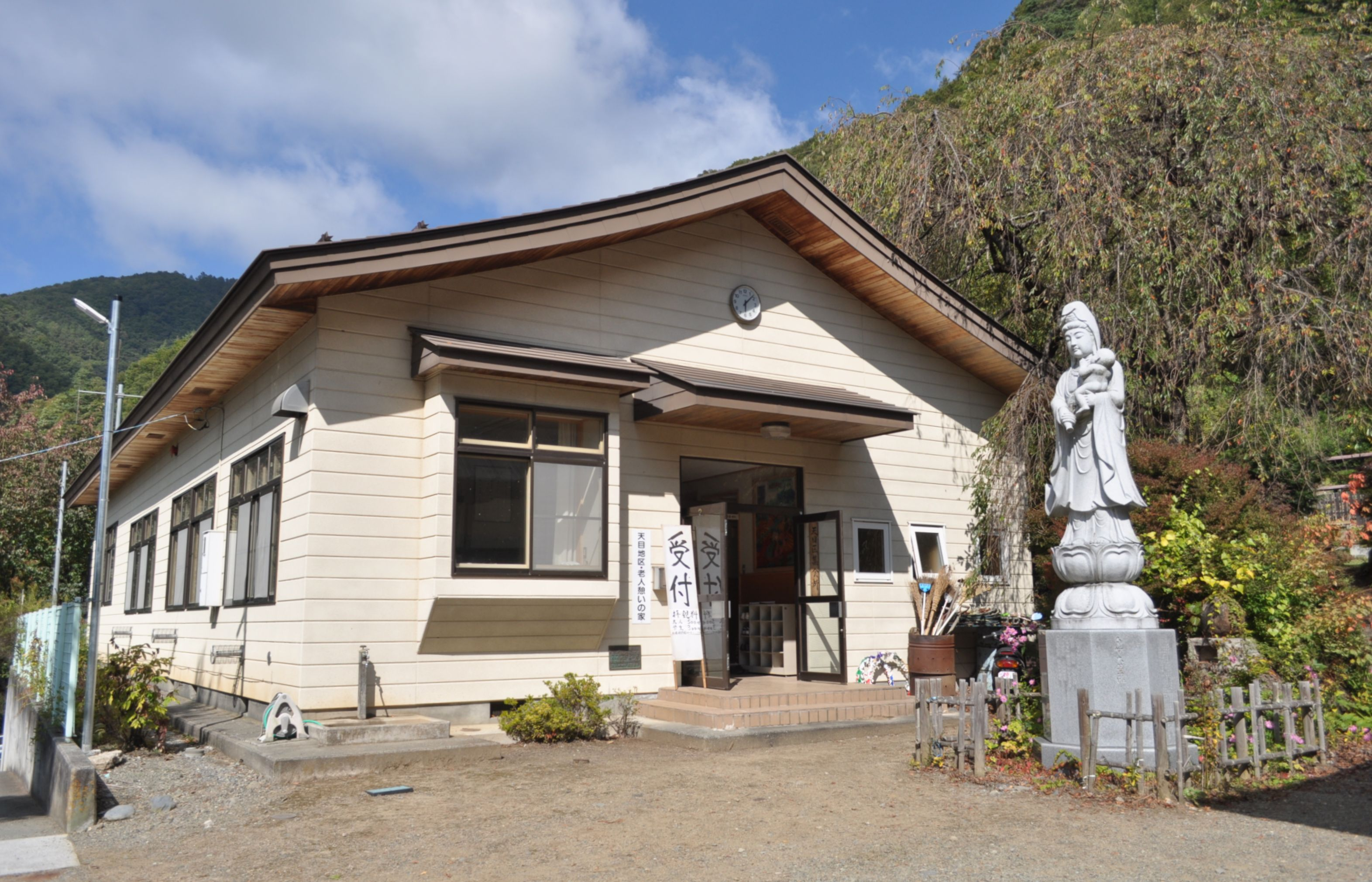
Tenmoku meeting hall (taken on October 9, 2017)

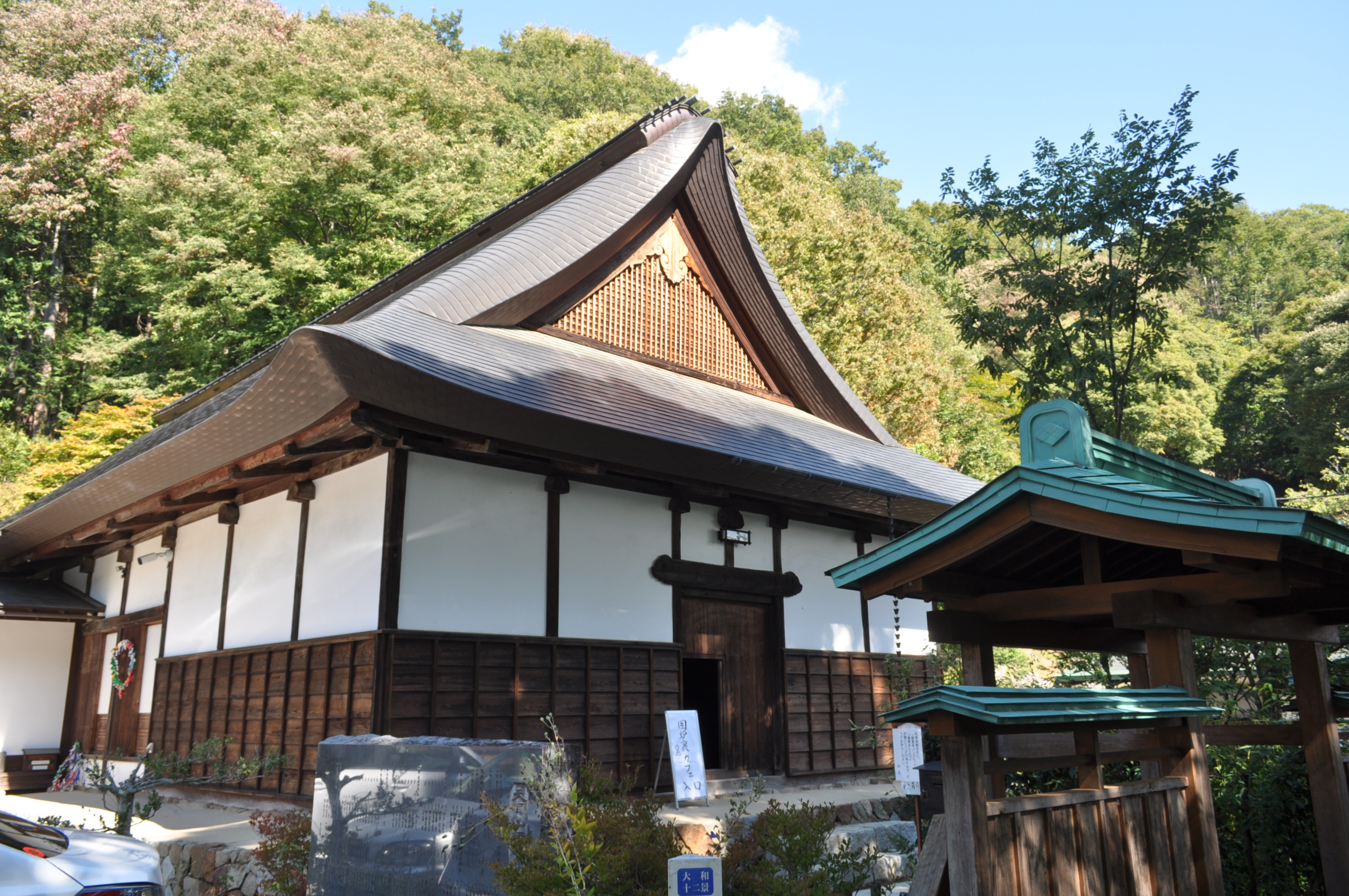
Koryu (Prefecturally designated tangible cultural property, taken on October 9, 2017)

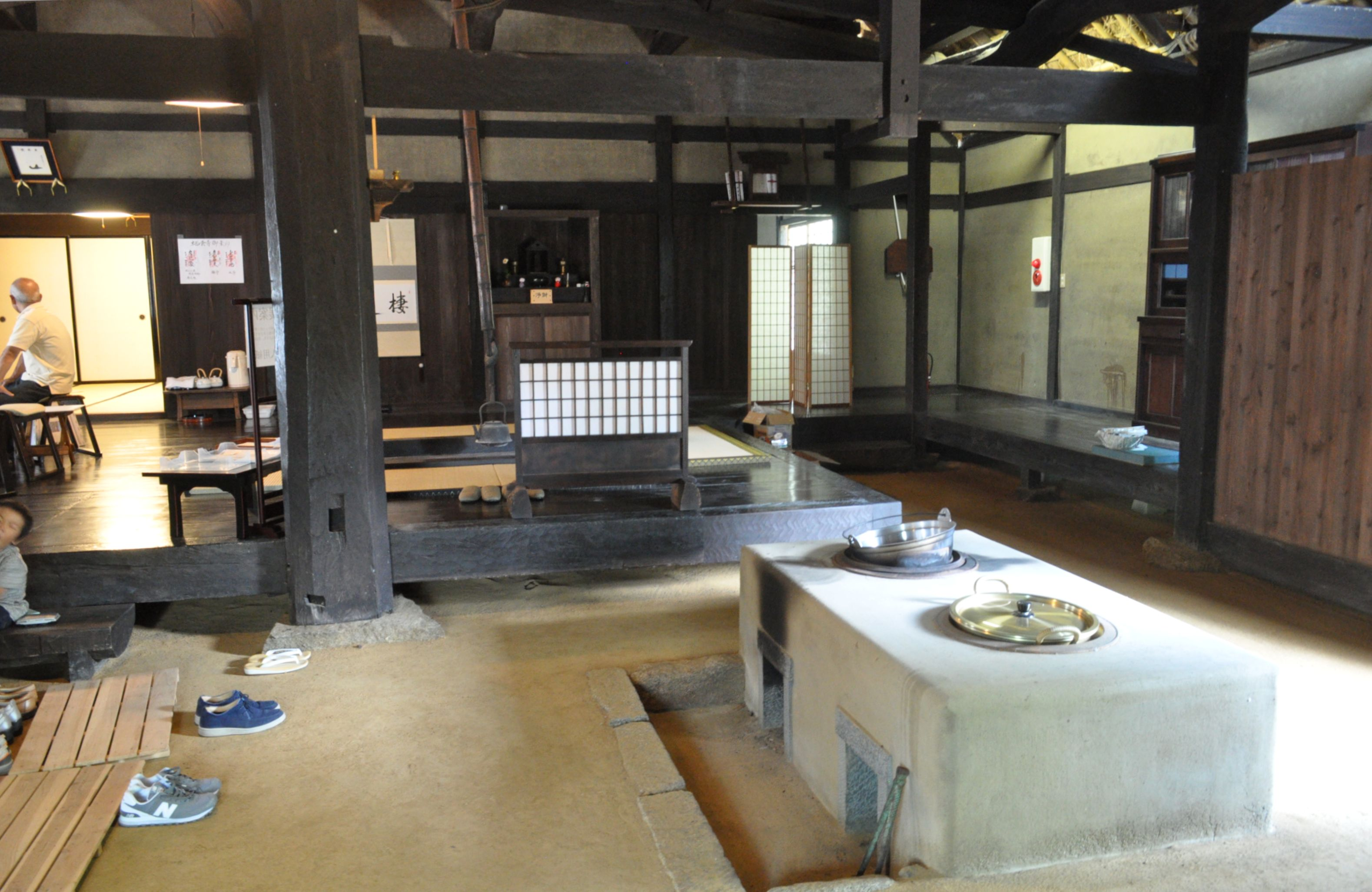
Same left, interior (taken on October 9, 2017)

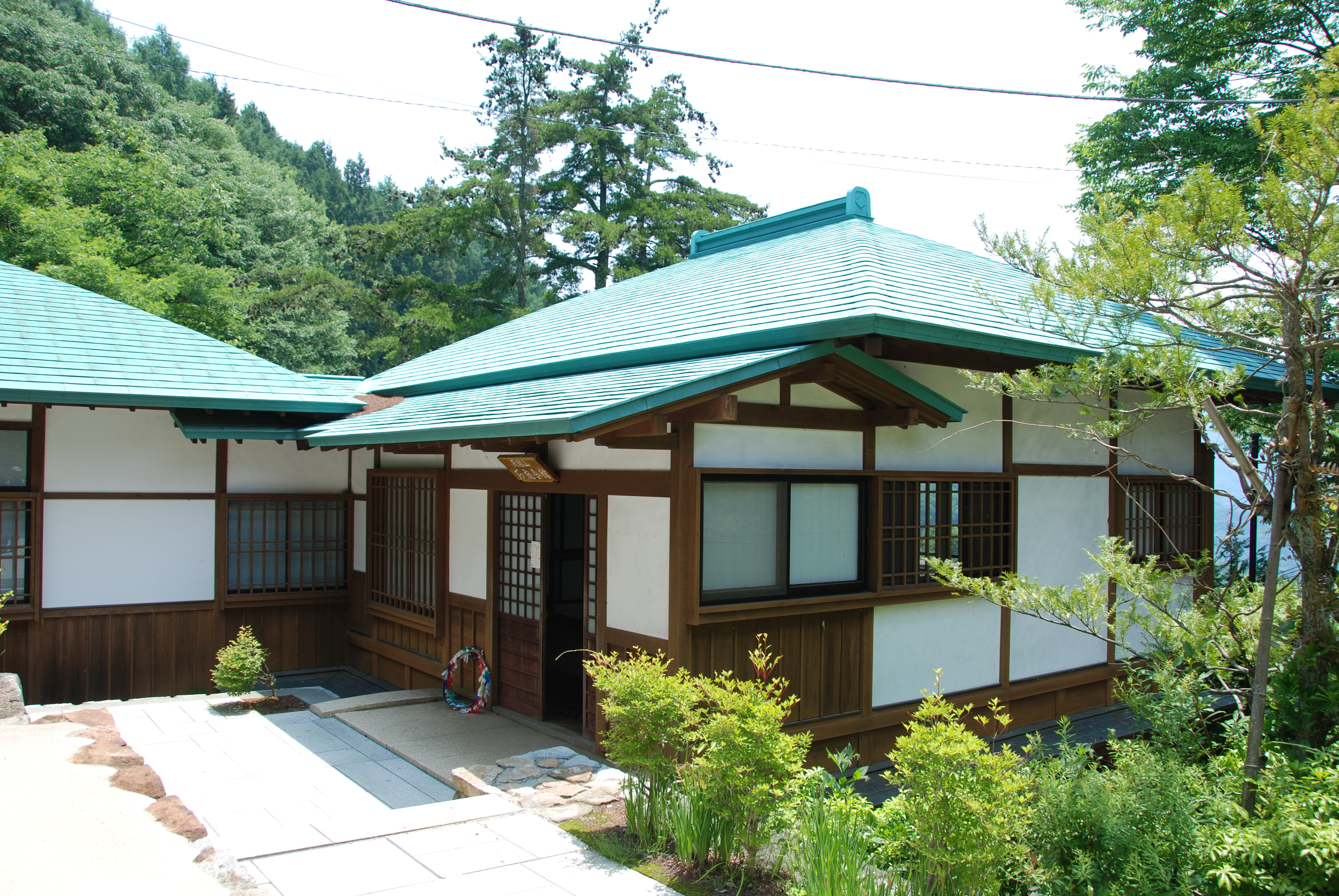
Seiunji Kaikan

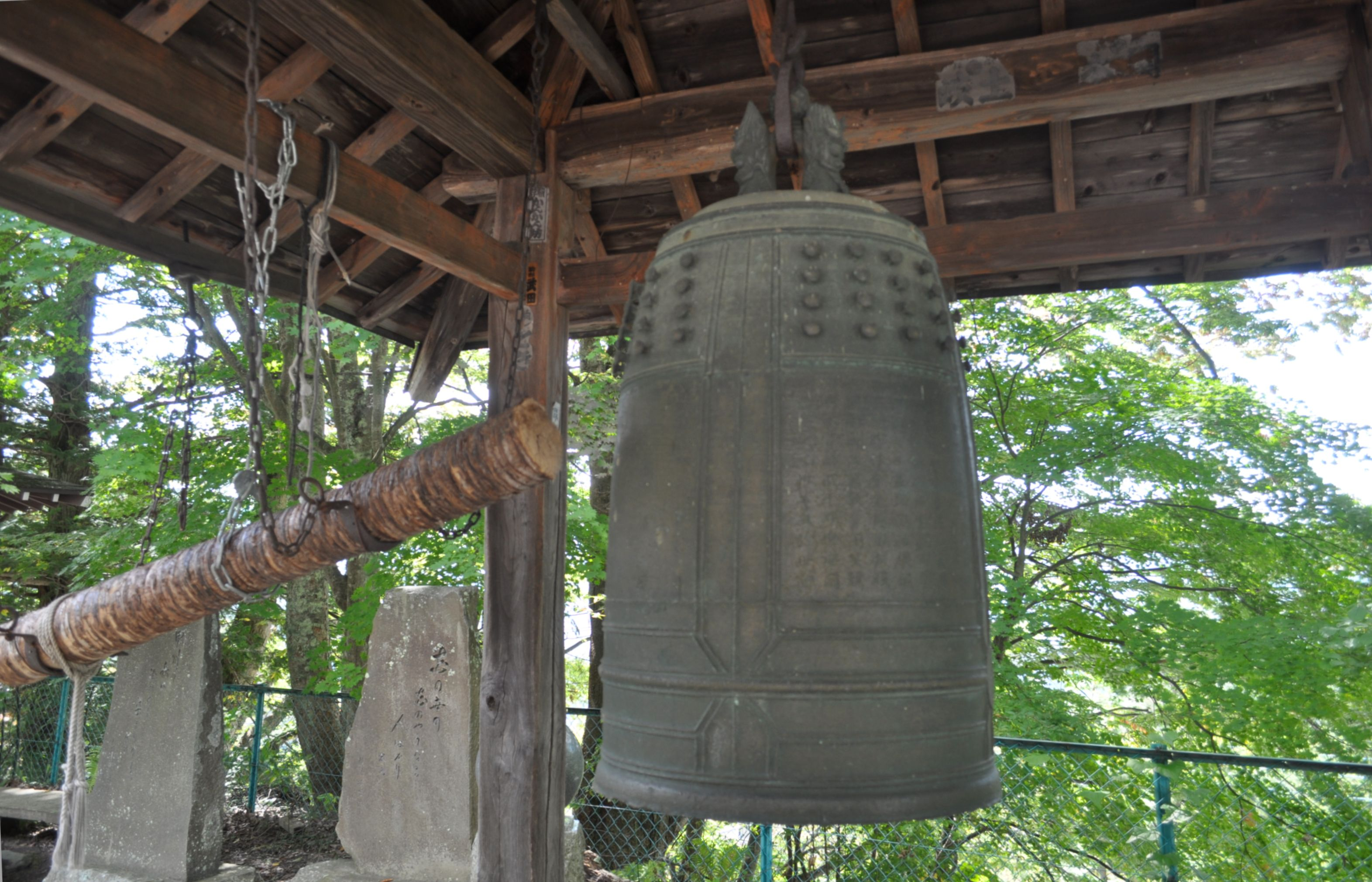
Copper bell, one of the "Five Bells of Kai" (Prefecturally designated tangible cultural property, photographed on October 9, 2017)

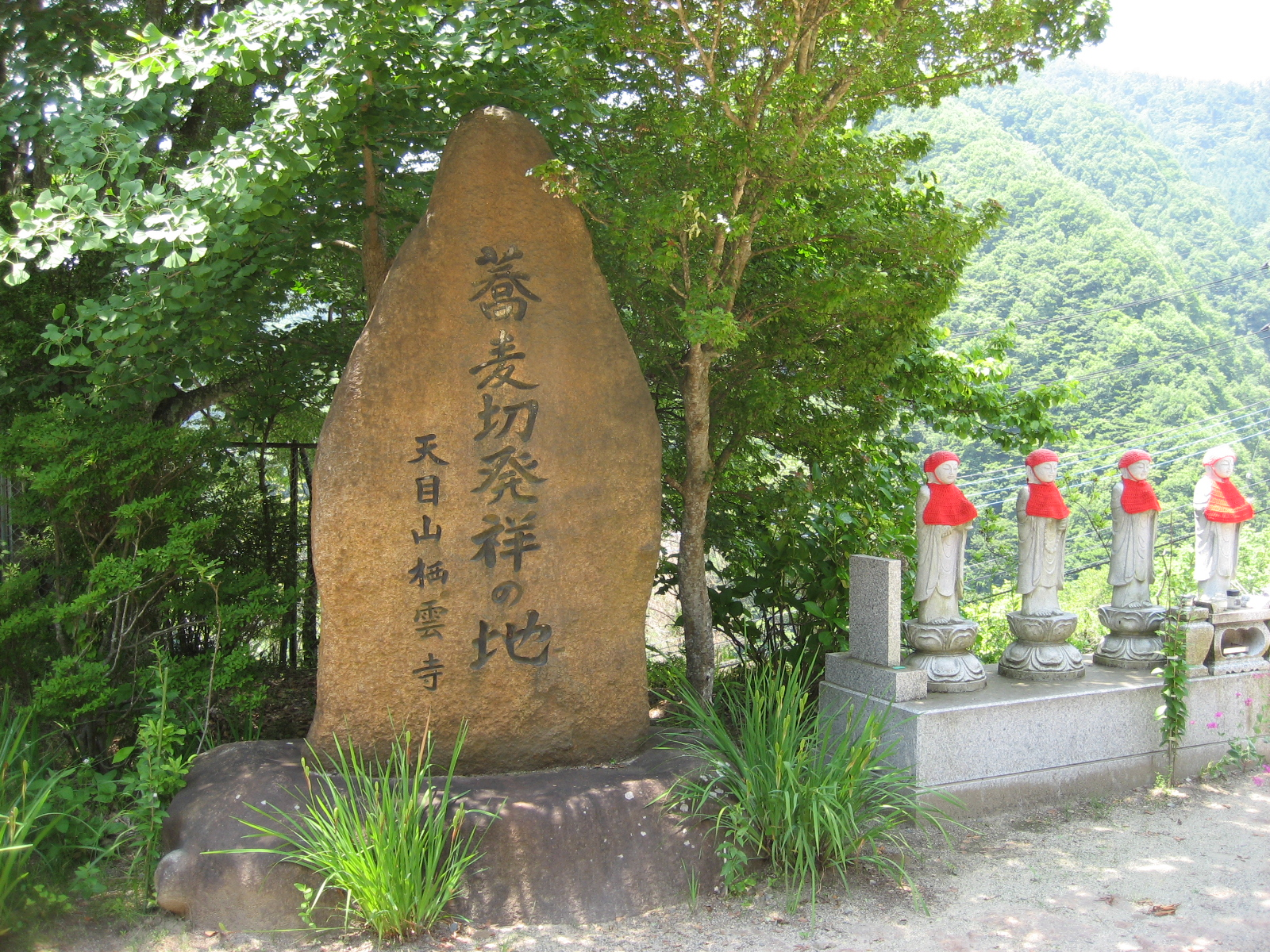
Stone monument at the "Birthplace of Soba Kiri".

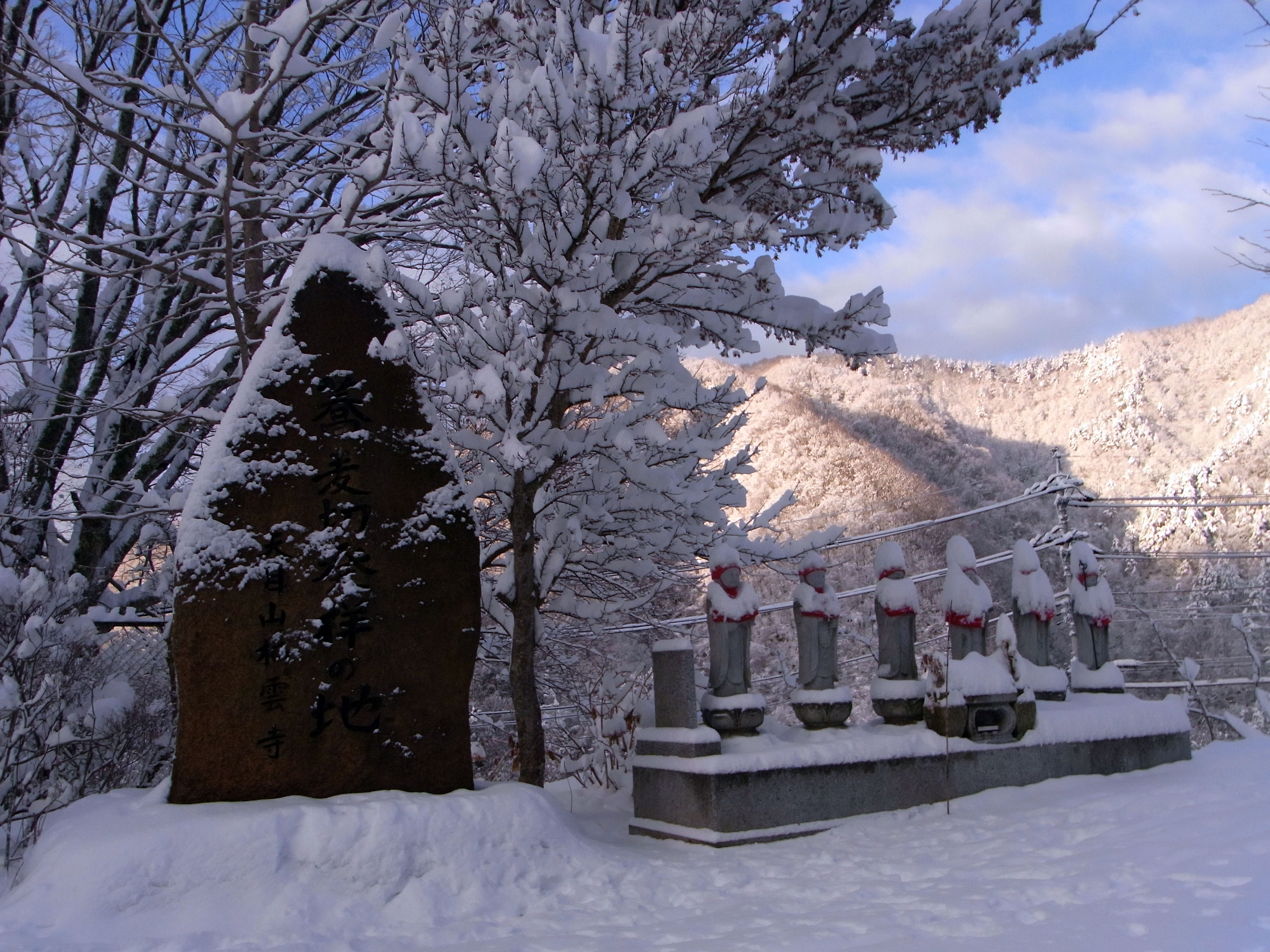
Snow scene, same left

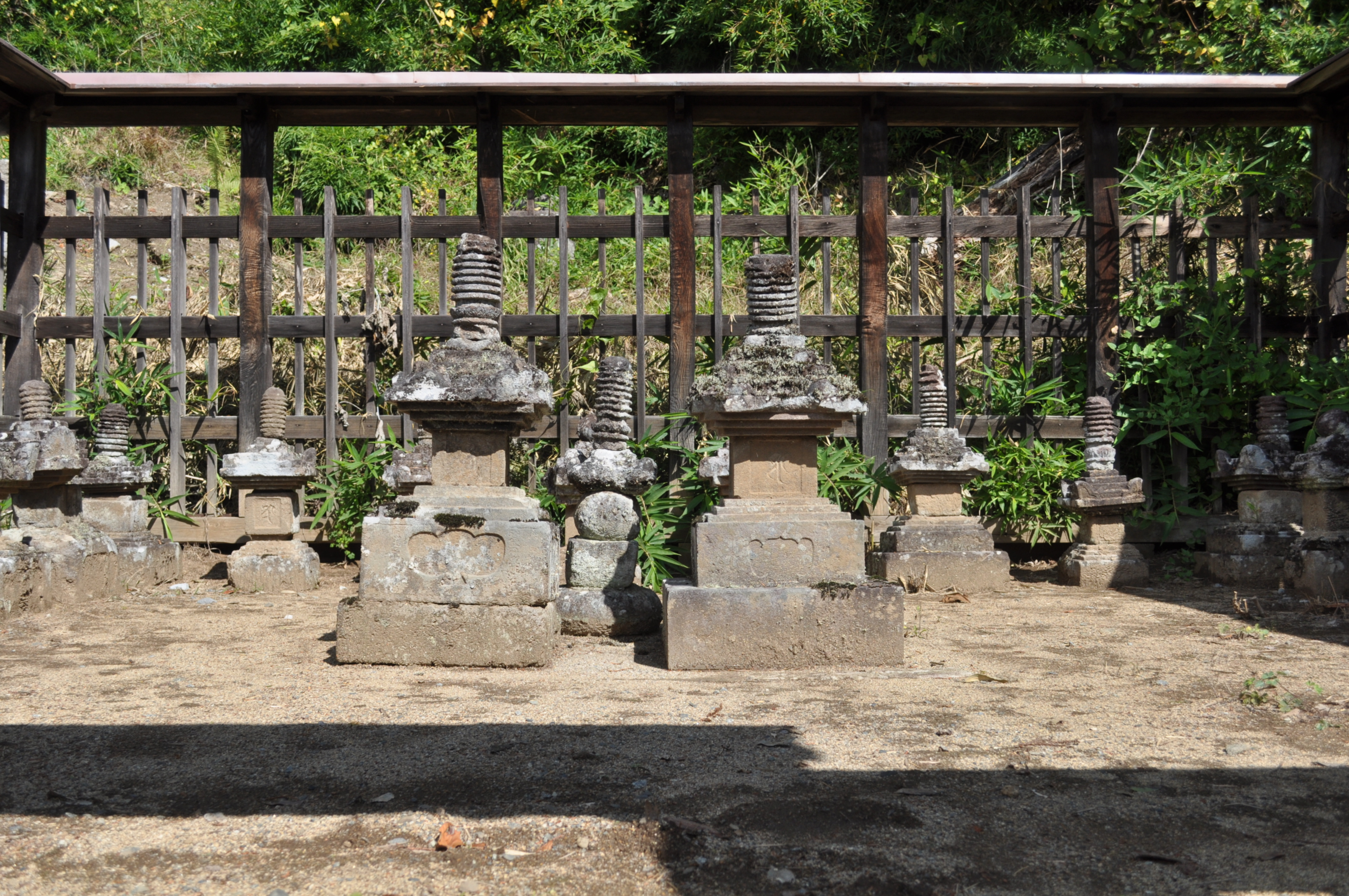
Grave of Takeda Nobumitsu, the 13th head of the Kai-Takeda clan (Hokyointo on the right of the center) (City designated historic site, photographed on October 9, 2017)

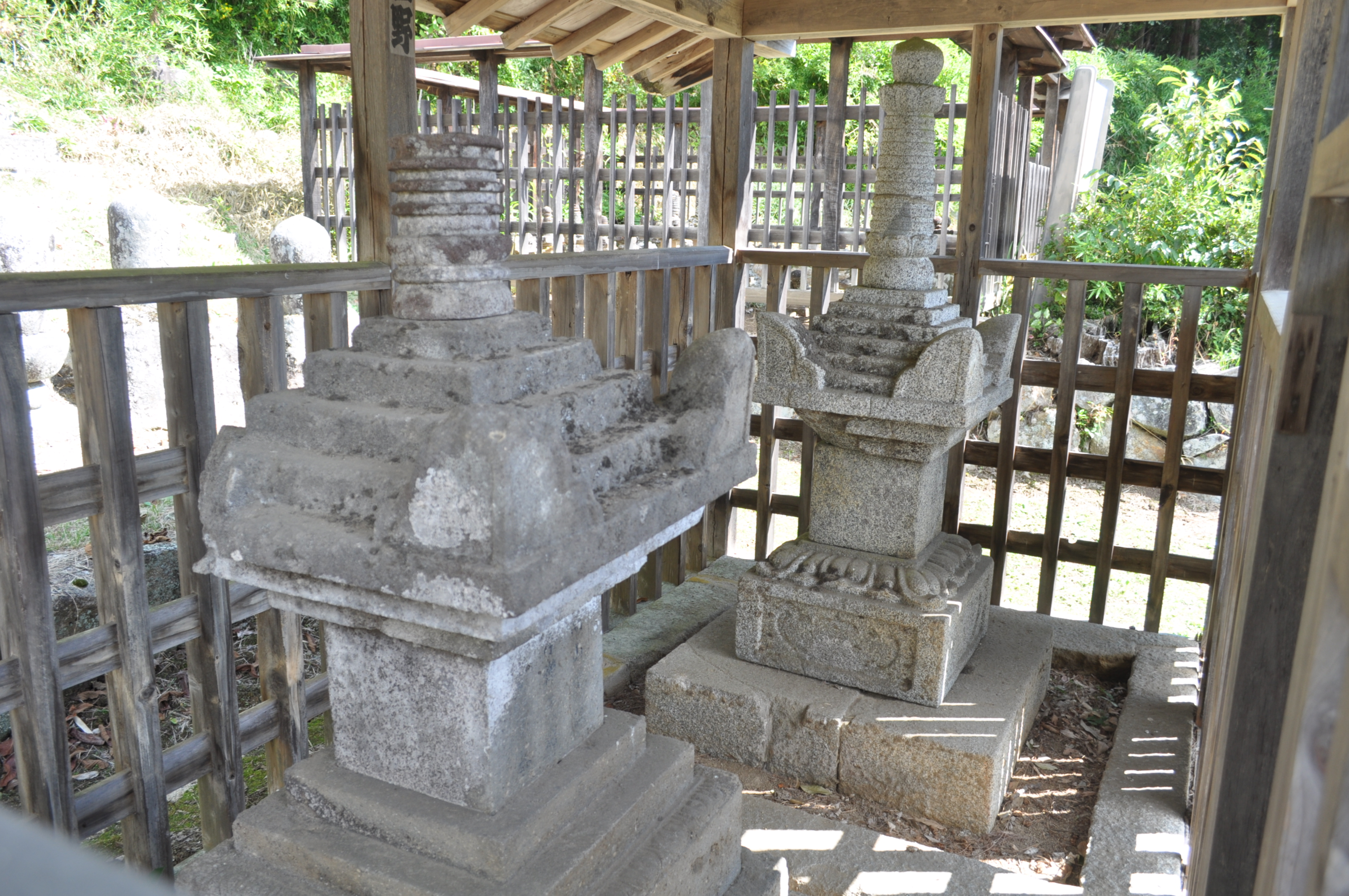
Seiunji Hokyoin-to (right side, Prefectural Tangible Cultural Property, taken October 9, 2017)

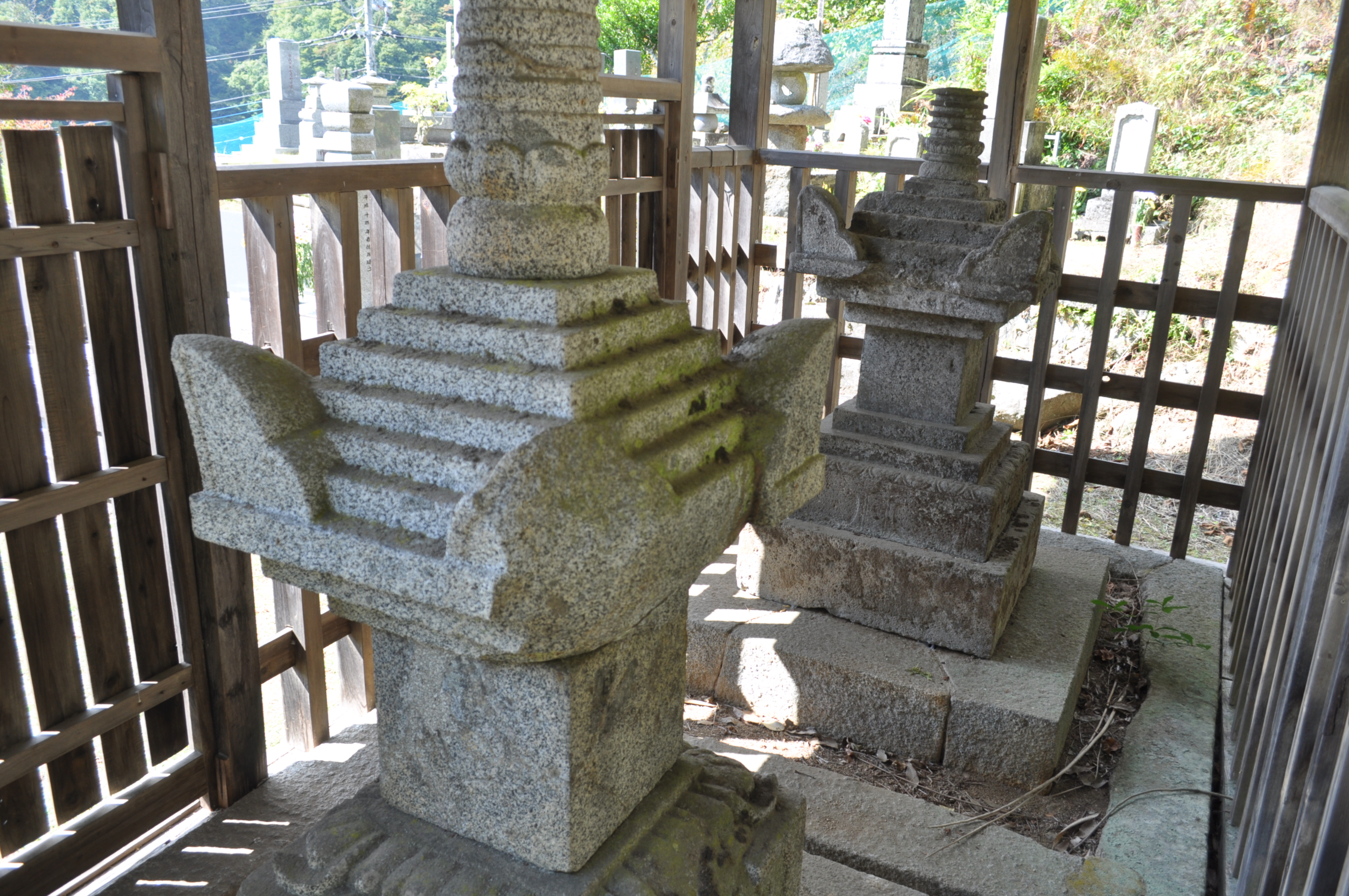
Seiunji Kaishin Hokyointo (Right side: Tangible Cultural Property, taken on October 9, 2017)

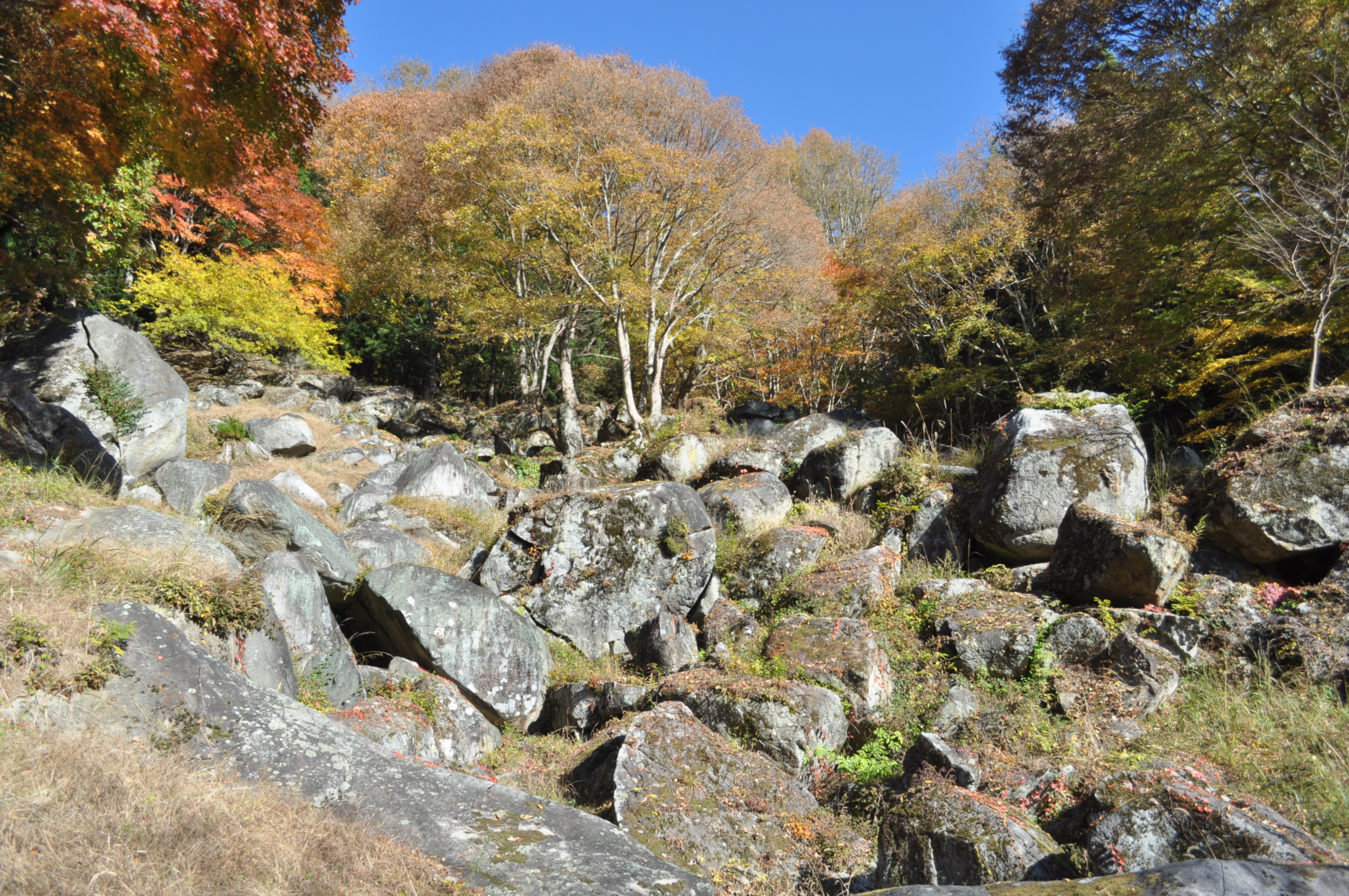
Garden (stone garden, prefectural scenic beauty, viewed from Ishiwa Kaikan, taken November 7, 2017)

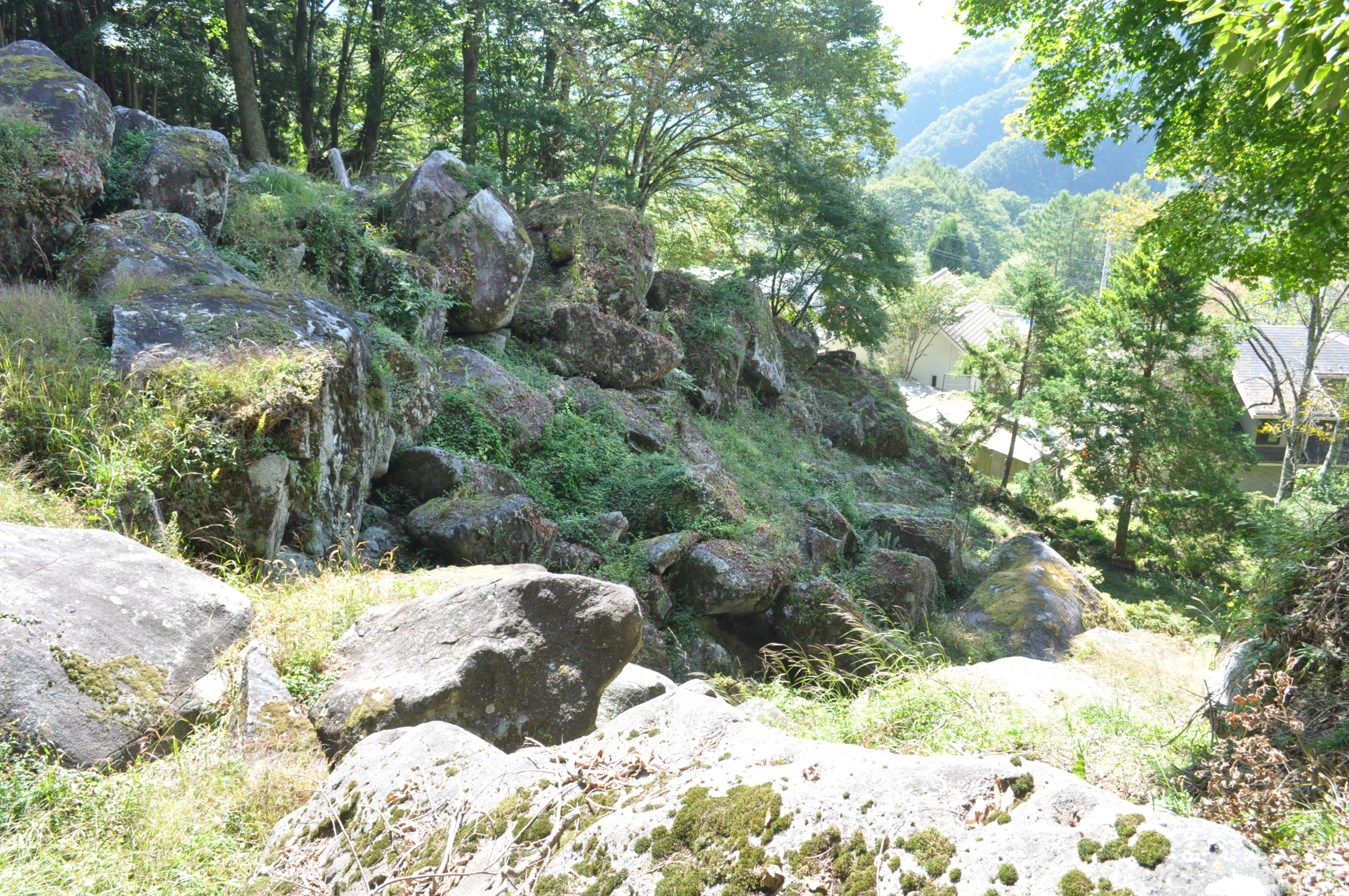
Garden (left, seen from the west, taken on October 9, 2017)

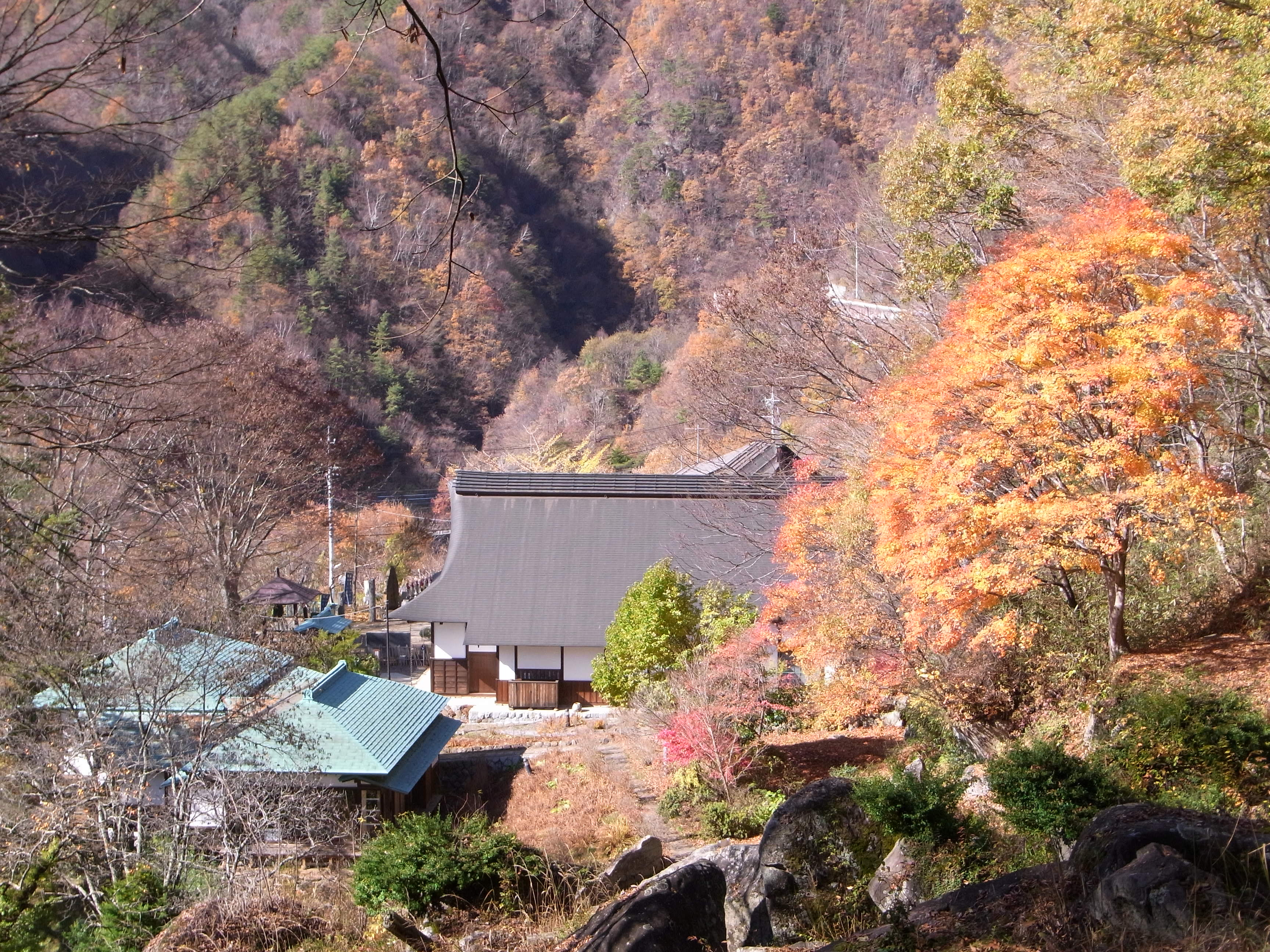
View from the stone garden

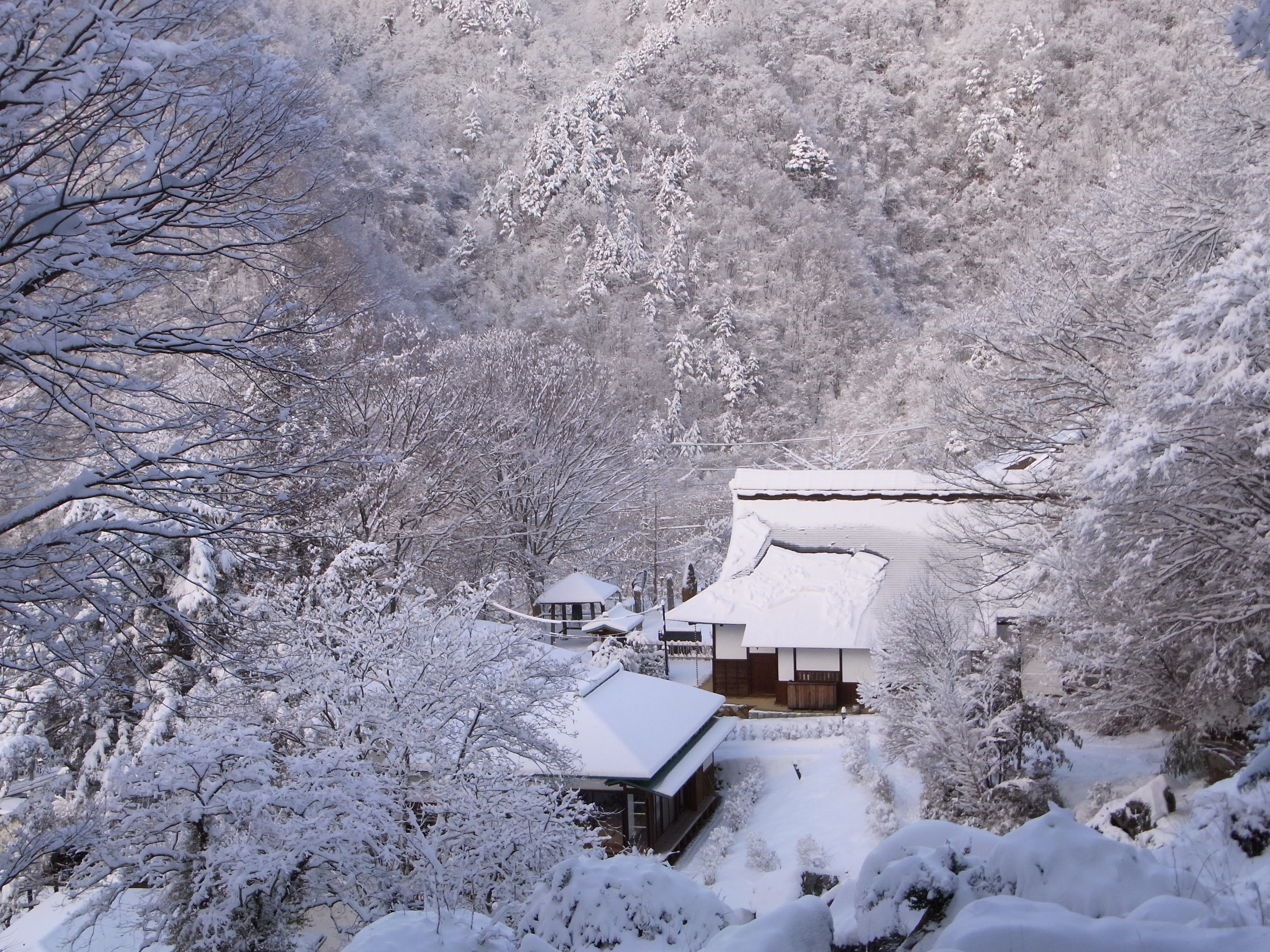
snow scene, same left

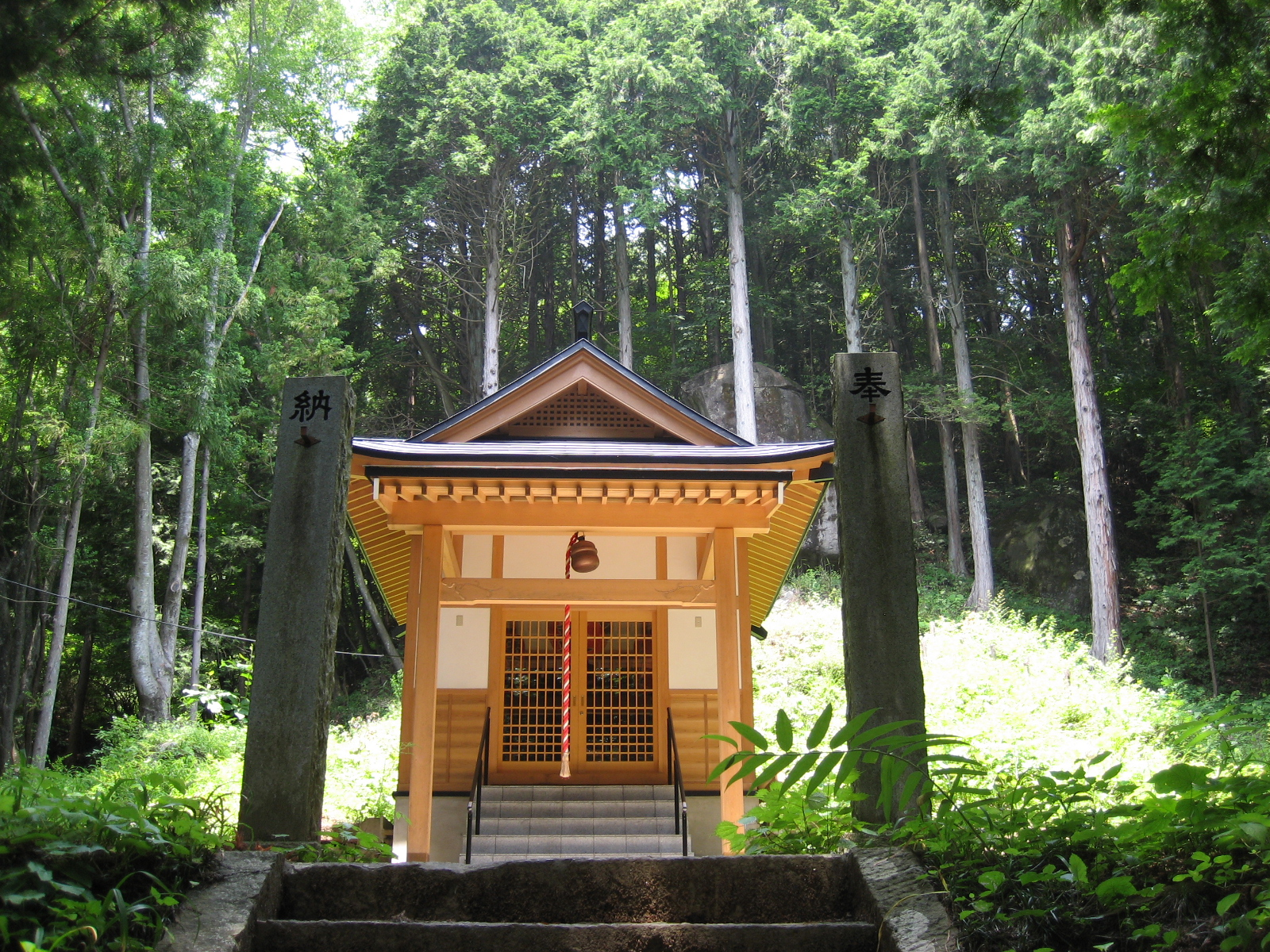
Marishiten

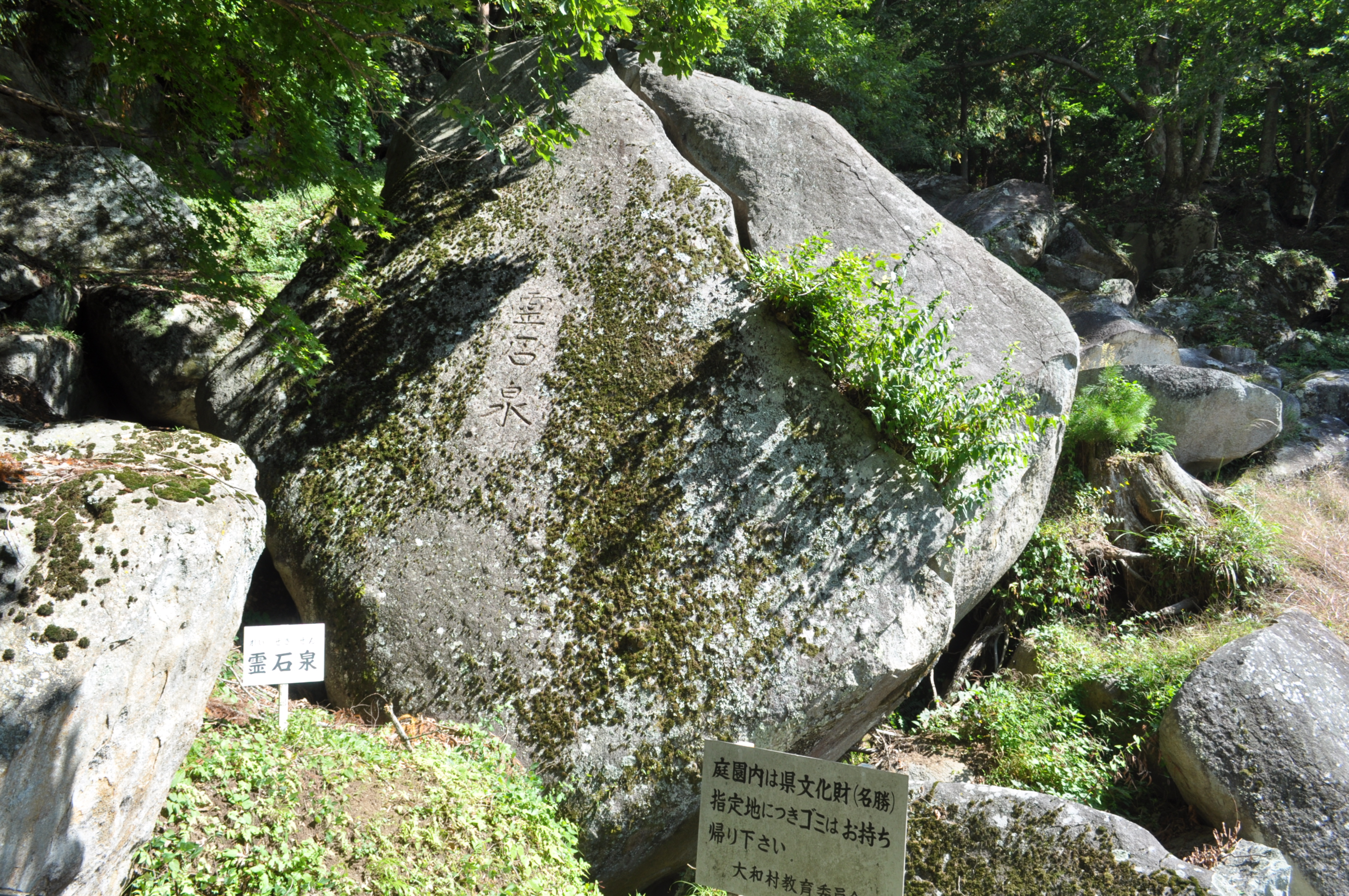
Jizo Bosatsu Buddha (Prefecturally designated tangible cultural property, taken October 9, 2017)

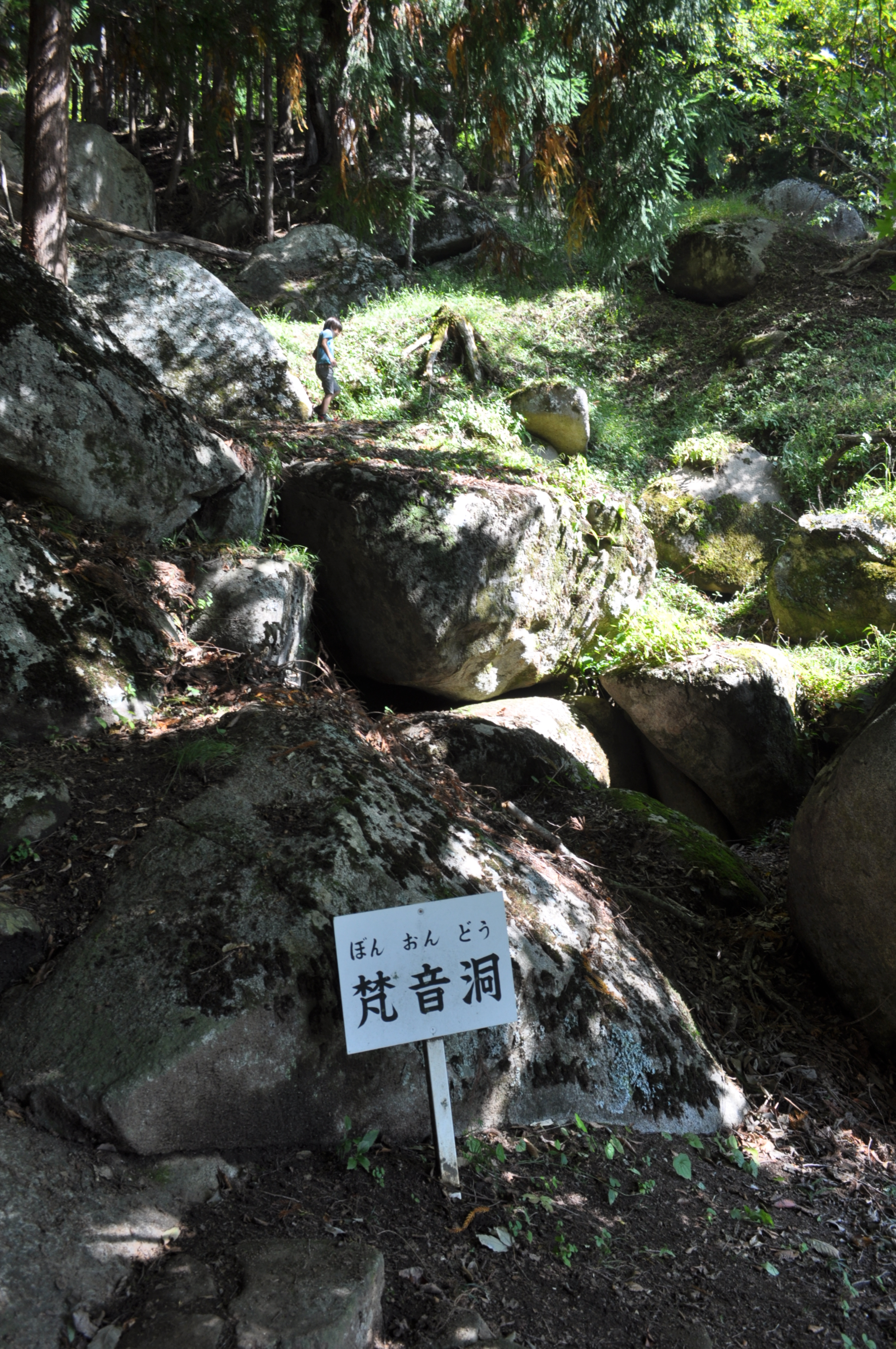
Bonin Cave (taken October 9, 2017)

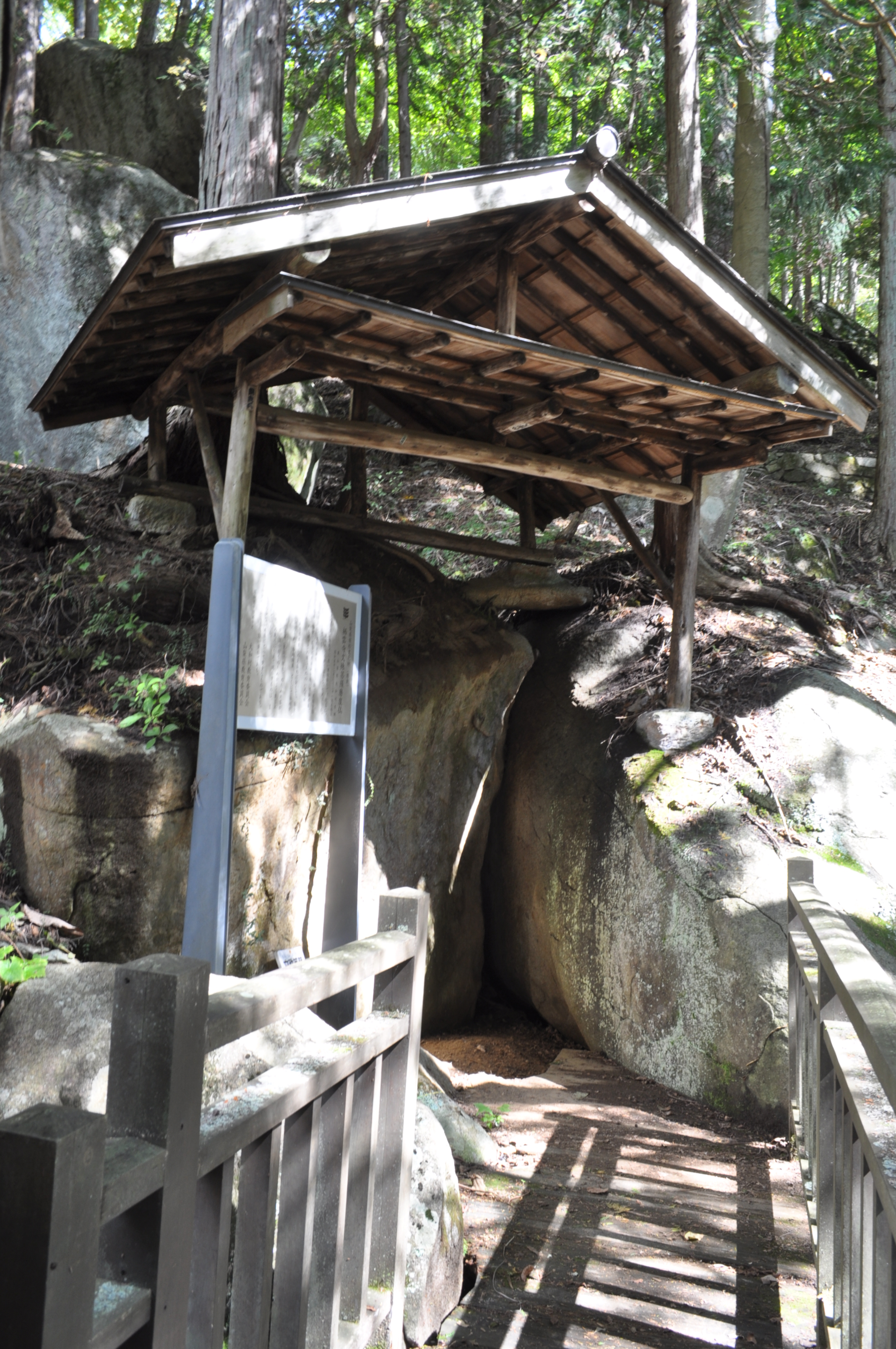
Buddha Monju Bosatsu (Tangible Cultural Property, taken October 9, 2017)

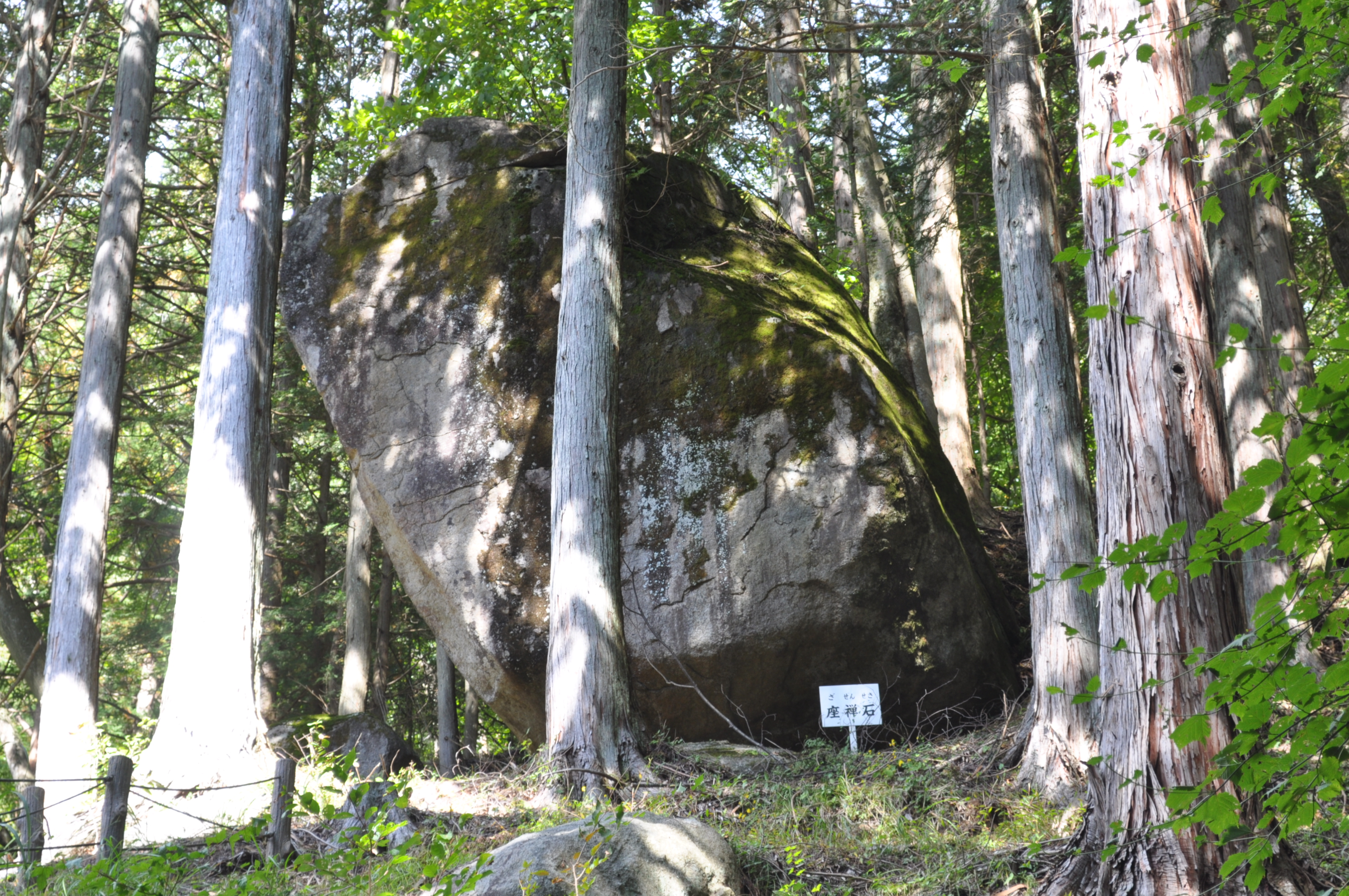
Zazen stone (taken on October 9, 2017)

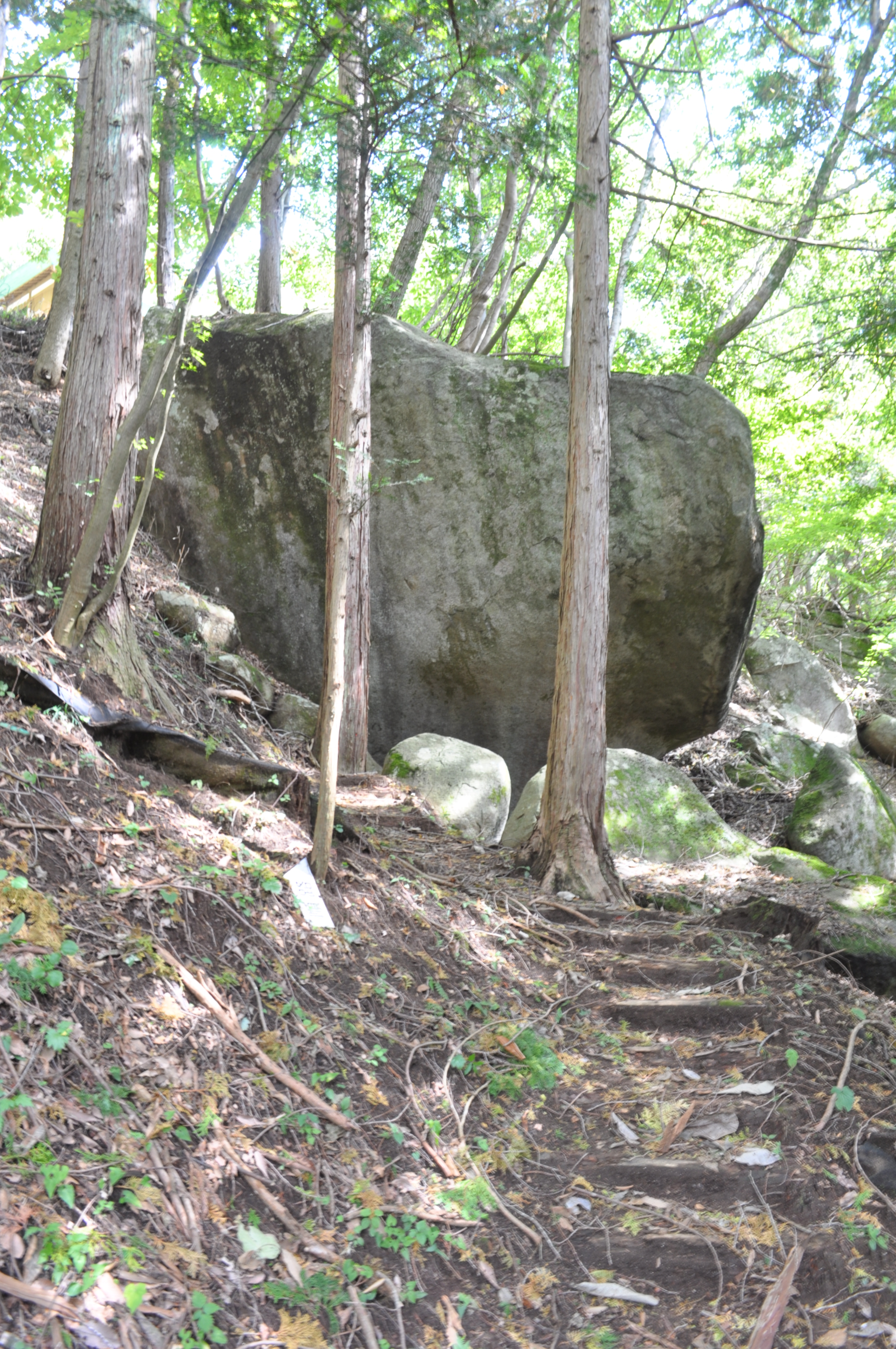
Nenjishi (taken on October 9, 2017)
Edited on October 2021

== Related items ==
- Rinzai school
- Hokyoin Pagoda
- Takeda Nobumitsu
