= 信光 =

信光 may refer to:

- Nobumitsu, masculine Japanese given name
- Xinguang (信光里), Taoyuan District, Taoyuan, Taiwan
