= Nobumitsu =

- Gender: Male

Origin
- Origin: Japanese
- Meaning: Different meanings depending on the kanji used

Nobumitsu (written: 信光) is a masculine Japanese given name. Notable people with the name include:

- Kanze Nobumitsu (観世 小次郎 信光; died 1516), Japanese playwright
- Katakura Nobumitsu (片倉 信光), Japanese samurai and writer
- Nobumitsu Yuhara (湯原 信光; born 1957), Japanese golfer
