= Moni Guangfo =

Chinese Manichaean manuscript

- 摩尼光佛

Information
- Religion: Chinese Manichaeism
- Language: Chinese
- Period: 9th–11th centuries CE
- Moni Guangfo at Chinese Wikisource

Moni Guangfo (Chinese: 摩尼光佛; pinyin: Móní Guāngfó; lit. 'Mani', 'Buddha of Light') is one of the longest and most important Xiapu Manichaean manuscripts. The manuscript contains 83 pages, 659 lines, and over 8,300 Chinese characters in total. The text was discovered by Chinese researchers in 2009 and belongs to Chen Peisheng 陈培生, a priest or ritual master (fashi 法师) in Shangwan Village 上万村, Baiyang Township, Xiapu County, Fujian Province, China.

Although the manuscript was likely transcribed a few hundred years ago, its contents date back to around the 9th–11th centuries. Moni Guangfo contains many Middle Iranian words transcribed using Chinese characters.

== Contents ==
The Moni Guangfo manuscript contains 83 pages, 659 lines (or columns), and over 8,300 Chinese characters. There are 82 pages of text, since the 83rd page is blank. An summary and outline of the text can be found in Ma & Wang (2018). Chapters in Moni guangfo 《摩尼光佛》 are:

1. Xiasheng zan 《下生贊》
2. Jisi zhou 《吉斯咒》
3. Tianwang zan 《天王贊》
4. Chengyang libai dasheng, shizun 《稱揚禮拜大聖，世尊》
5. Qiqing zhufa zhong 《啟請諸法眾》
6. Kaitan zan 《開壇贊》
7. Gongjing shifang changzhu sanbao 《恭敬十方常住三寶》
8. San guiyi 《三皈依》
9. Yi fo jianxiu, ru fa zhufen xiu 《依佛漸修，如法炷焚修》
10. Daxiang zan 《大香贊》
11. Dui tudi zan 《対土地贊》
12. (Sui'an chang) Wuleizi 《隨案唱五雷子》
13. Xieshi zuo xinli 《歇時做信禮》
14. (Sui'an chang) Liantai 《隨案唱蓮台》
15. Wu fo ji 《五佛記》
16. Xin mingjie 《新明界》

A more detailed outline of Moni Guangfo is given below.

Part 1
Rituals for Good Fortune (qing fu ke 請福科) (columns 1–292)

- First Period (columns 1–148)
  - Inviting Buddhas (qingfo 請佛) (Five Buddhas and Triratna) (columns 1–48): Nārāyaṇa, Zoroaster, Śākyamuni, Jesus, and Mani
  - Venerating the Triratna (san guiyi 三皈依) (columns 49–66): Buddha, the Dharma, and the Saṅgha
  - Incense Offering Praise (xiangzan 香讚) (columns 67–85)
  - Inviting Buddhas (Buddhas of Five Directions) (columns 86–97): Raphael (嚧縛逸), Michael (彌訶逸), Gabriel (業囉逸), Sariel (娑囉逸), and Jacob (耶具孚)
  - Praising the King of [Ten] Heavens (Zan Tianwang 讃天王) (columns 98–116)
  - Praise to Land's Gods (Tudi zan 土地讃) (columns 117–148): contains six hymns
    - 1st piece: Middle Iranian mantra
    - 2nd piece: Chinese piece
    - 3rd piece: Middle Iranian mantra
    - 4th piece: Chinese piece
    - 5th piece: Middle Iranian mantra
    - 6th piece: mixed Middle Iranian and Chinese piece
- Second Period (dier shi 第二時) (columns 148–238)
  - Inviting Buddhas (columns 149–207)
    - Inviting Moluo (Father of Greatness) 默羅 (columns 159–163)
    - Inviting Yishu 夷數 (Jesus) (columns 164–168)
    - Inviting Jinni lushen 謹你嚧詵 (Virgin of Light) (columns 168–173)
    - Inviting Moni 摩尼 (Mani) (columns 174–177)
    - Inviting Sun and Moon Buddhas of Light (columns 178–181)
    - Inviting Lushena 盧舍那 (Vairocana) (columns 182–186)
    - Inviting Venerable Buddha Who Upholds the World (Keeper of Splendor) (columns 187–190)
    - Inviting Four Great Venerable Buddhas (columns 191–194): Nārāyaṇa, Zoroaster, Śākyamuni, and Jesus
    - Inviting the Jade Emperor (King of Honor, or King of the Ten Heavens) (columns 195–198)
    - Inviting various great Bodhisattvas (columns 199–202)
    - Inviting all past and future Buddhas (columns 203–206)
    - Gatha to finish the invitation of the Buddhas (columns 207–208)
  - Worshipping Buddhas (lifo 禮佛) (Three Great Saints) (columns 209–229): Lightning King (i.e., Virgin of Light), Jesus, and the Long Life Nectar King (i.e., Mani)
  - Reading the Scriptures (kangjing 看經) and Reading Goddess Incantation (nian tiannü zhou 念《天女咒》) (columns 230–238)
- Third and Fourth Periods (disan shi 第三時, disi shi 第四時) (columns 238–247)
  - First Purification of the Altar (shou jingtan 首浄壇) (columns 248–255)
  - Inviting Buddhas (North Heavenly King, i.e. Raphael) (columns 256–264)
  - Penitential Mysterious Prayer (Chanhui xuanwen 懺悔玄文) (columns 265–271)
- Reading Prayer, Praise to the Envoys of Light (xuanshu, mingshi zan 宣疏、明使讚) (columns 271–282)
  - Farewell Ritual for the Buddhas (songfo 送佛) (columns 282–292)

Part 2
Rituals for Funeral (Jianwang ke 薦亡科) (columns 292–659)

- Praise of the Descent (Xiasheng zan 下生讚) (columns 292–312): incarnation in Suristān
- Incantation of St. George (Jisi zhou 吉思咒) (columns 312–331)
- Worshipping Buddhas (columns 331–365)
- Inviting Buddhas (Five Buddhas) (columns 366–373): Nārāyaṇa, Zoroaster, Śākyamuni, Jesus, and Mani
- Worshipping Buddhas (columns 374–388): Nārāyaṇa, Zoroaster, Śākyamuni, Jesus, and Mani
- Purification of Speech (columns 388–394): Middle Iranian mantra
- Inviting Buddhas (Heavenly Kings and Envoys of Light) (columns 394–403): Raphael, Michael, Gabriel, Sariel, and other envoys of light.
- Praise of Preparing the Altar (kaitan zan 開壇讃) (columns 403–419): worshipping and praising the Light-Nous
- Honoring Universal Permanent Triratna (gongjing shifang changzhu sanbao 恭敬十方常住三寶) (columns 420–425)
- Venerating the Triratna (columns 425–444)
- Incense Offering Praise (columns 445–459)
- Great Praising Incense Offering (da zanxiang 大讃香) (columns 460–481)
- Inviting Five Buddhas (columns 483–515): Nārāyaṇa (Naluoyan 那羅延), Zoroaster (Suluzhi 蘇路支), Śākyamuni (Shijiawen 釋迦文), Jesus (Yishu 夷數), and Mani (Moni 摩尼)
- Rest (xieshi 歇時), Performing Worshipping (zuo xinli 做信禮) (columns 516–540)
- Singing "Lotus Stand" (chang liantai 唱蓮臺) (columns 540–565)
- Leading the Deceased Souls to the Right Path (deng zhenglu 登正路) (columns 565–596)
  - Ascending the Precious Palace (columns 566–572)
  - Ascending the Glory Palace (columns 573–577)
  - Ascending the Moon Palace (columns 578–582)
  - Ascending the Sun Palace (columns 583–587)
  - Ascending Eternal Light (columns 588–589)
  - Ascending the Three Constancies (columns 590–592): the Father of Greatness, Jesus, and the Light-Nous
- Worshipping the Five Buddhas (columns 597–630): Mani, Nārāyaṇa, Zoroaster, Śākyamuni, and Jesus
- Praise to Five Pleasures (columns 631–645): wisdom, light, power, purity (divinity), and obeying the Buddha's teaching
- Gatha of the New Light-World (columns 648–658)

== Pantheon ==
The Manichaean pantheon names in Moni Guangfo are quite similar to, but not identical to, the names used in the Dunhuang Manichaean texts. They include:

- Merciful Mother = Cimu 慈母 ‘Merciful Mother’
- Primal Man = Xianyi 先意 ‘Primal Thought’
- Manichaean pair of Call and Answer = Guanyin 觀音 (Sanskrit Avalokiteśvara) and Shizhi 勢至 (Sanskrit Mahāsthāmaprāpta)
- Virgin of Light = Dianguang 電光 ‘Lightning’; Dianguang wangfo 電光王佛 ‘Royal Buddha of Lightning’; shentong Dianguang wang 神通電光王 ‘Lightning sovereign with supernatural powers’
- Living Spirit = Riguang Jingfeng 日光淨風 ‘Sunshine Pure Wind’
- Rex Honoris = Shitian wang 十天王 ‘King of the Ten Firmaments’
- Splendor, Splenditenens = Chishi zunfo 持世尊佛 ‘World-Holder Honorable Buddha’
- Light-Nous = Weimiao shanxin wang 微妙善心王 ‘King of Subtle and Wonderful, Beneficent Mind’; Weimiao Da Huiming 微妙大惠明 ‘Subtle and Wonderful Great Wisdom Light’; Weimiao Jingfafeng 微妙淨法風 ‘Subtle and Wonderful Pure Law Wind’
- Jesus = Yishu 夷數
- Column of Glory = Jin'gang xiangzhu Lushena fo 金剛相柱 盧舍那佛 ‘Diamond Column of Glory, Vairocana Buddha’
