= Incomplete scripture of Manichaeism =

Manichaean manuscript

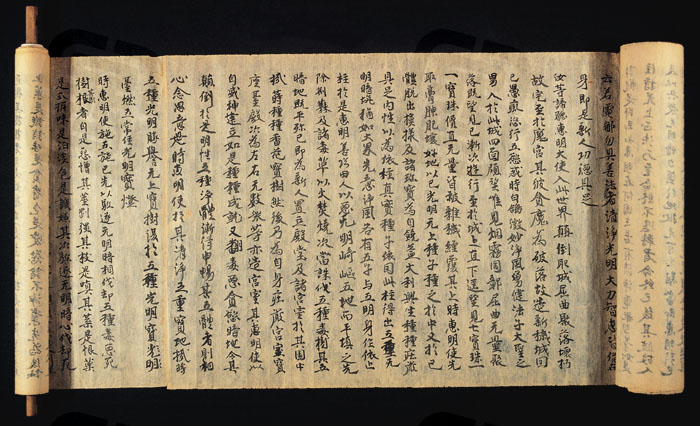
- Material: paper
- Size: 639 × 27 cm
- Writing: Middle Chinese
- Created: Tang dynasty
- Discovered: 1907 in Dunhuang Mogao Grotto Buddhist scripture cave
- Present location: Beijing National Library of China
- Identification: BD00256

The Incomplete scripture of Manichaeism was discovered by British archaeologist Aurel Stein in Mogao Caves. The Tang dynasty Manichean Dunhuang Manuscripts of Jingdong is one of the three Manichaeism Dunhuang Chinese Documents. They are now held in the collection of National Library of China, number BD00256.

== Introduction ==
In 1911, Luo Zhenyu was not sure what Persian religion the scriptures belonged to, so he published the recorded text in the second volume of the "Guoxue Series" under the name "Incomplete Persian Scripture". In the same year, French Sinologists Shawan and Perch and translated the scripture into French and considered them as Manichaean scripture. The manuscript is in scrolls, with an incomplete head. It currently has 345 lines and approximately 7,000 characters. It is currently the only Chinese Manichean classic in China. Its writing is like a scripture, and the content uses a question and answer between the leader Mani and the apostle Mar Adda to explain the Manichaeism's doctrine of the coexistence of light and dark.

== See also ==
- Chinese Manichaean hymn scroll
- Manichaean Compendium
