= Manichaean stone reliefs of Shangwan village =

Manichaean reliefs in China

Manichaean stone statues in Shangwan Village
- Material: stone
- Writing: Traditional Chinese
- Created: Ming dynasty, number B is Qing dynasty cultural relics
- Discovered: Shangwan Village, Xiapu County, 2009
- Present location: Fujian Province Shangwan Village, Xiapu County

The Manichaean stone sculptures of Shangwan Village refer to eight Ming-Qing slabs found in Shangwan Village, Xiapu County, Ningde City, Fujian Province in 2009. Numbers A1, A2, B, C1, C2, D1, D2, E, which have been verified by scholars as the relics of Manichaeism (also known as Mingjiao in Chinese). These stone slabs were originally used to decorate the Three Buddha Pagodas and the Pangong Stone Pagoda. The inscriptions on the stone slabs indicate that the Three Buddhas Pagoda was built in the sixth year of Zhengde in the Ming dynasty. According to Huang Yizhao's Tahou Village Cultural Relics, the Three Buddhas Tower was originally three towers, one large and two small, which were later demolished during the Cultural Revolution.

After the news of the discovery of Manichaean deities in Fujian reached Iran, it aroused the interest of local religious scholars. Although Manichaeism originated in ancient Iran during the reign of the Sasanian Shahanshah Shapur I, it has long since disappeared in its native land, leaving almost no cultural relics. Therefore, Fujian has become the only place in the world where the statues and reliefs of Manichaeism are preserved. These statues and other Manichae relics discovered in Fujian during the same period are listed as one of the ten major discoveries in Fujian.

== Introduction ==
reliefs A1 and A2

- A1: This statue of the main deity of one of the three stupas has been basically destroyed, only the backlight remains. The backlight is designed with the sun wheel and the moon wheel as the design concept, the interior has a radial pattern of light, and the periphery is decorated with auspicious clouds. Identified by Zhong Liang, Ou Donghai, and Wu Chunming of the Ningde Cultural Museum, it is suspected to be related to the Manichaean model of "Worship on the day and the moon by night." If you look at the base, moiré, and backlight as a whole, the shape is like a tree. The tree has a special place in Manichaeism. The Father of Greatness worshipped by the religion is hailed as a "living tree", while the Prince of Darkness is hailed as a "dead tree". Chen Jinguo, the author of The New Discovery of Mingjiao, judged that this image is the fifth Buddha worshipped by Mingjiao—Moniguang Buddha. link with A2
- A2: It belongs to three pagoda statues, additional statues, a main column, an engraving table to sit in the lotus statues, knot Jiafu Zuo, wearing sleeves large robe, placed his hands before the seat cover is sleeved, The headscarf covering the forehead is decorated with mani beads. There is a round headlight engraved on the back of the head, and there is a circle of backlight behind it, and its periphery is decorated with moiré. According to research, it is believed that the backlight represents the sun and the moon, and the image is likely to be the "Great Sage Zhenming Dharma Lightning King Buddha" or "Lingming Great Sky Lightning King Buddha", that is, the Virgin of Light. The "Xingfu Ancestor's Birthday Section" in the "Xiapu Manuscript" invites "The Great Sage Zhenming Dharma Lightning King Buddha, the Great Sage Yansheng Benefiting the Numbers and the Buddha, the Great Sage Longevity Mani Light Buddha, wishing to give a longevity feast, "Proof of practice" such a mantra. link with A1

relief B

- B: This stone slab is engraved with three statues sitting side by side. It was originally a member of the Qing Gong Pagoda. The three statues all have heads. The middle statue sits in knots, wears a square crown hat, and wears an unbuttoned wide-sleeved shirt. The chest is decorated with an embroidered ribbon tied with a bow, and the hands are exposed. Which is embroidered with bow-tie Jinjiang Hermitage Zaoxing characterized Mani statues similar light. The figure on the left is dressed in a hooded dress, with a double bow tie and wide-clothes, with long sleeves covering his hands, similar to a portrait. The statue on the right is without a cap, with both hands exposed outside the sleeves, holding a suspected monkey in the left hand, and pressing an object resembling a dog with the right hand, which is close to a martial arts statue. According to research, it is believed that the middle statue is the portrait of Lin Peng (1003-1059), a famous Mingjiao celebrity in the Northern Song dynasty, with the image on the left as Marshal Kang and the martial image on the right as Marshal Wen .link

relief C1

relief C2

- C1, C2 : These two images are standing postures, from the three stupas, they should be left and right symmetrical statues. Both images wear a wide body jumpsuit with a tapered cap, a ribbon on the waist, and a knot hanging from the front abdomen. C1 holds a bell, which is similar to a female; C2 holds a vajra, which is similar to a male. These two statues should represent home listeners of Manichaeism, that is, non-monks. C1 C2

relief D1

relief D2

- D1, D2 : It is one of the three stupa components, both are standing statues standing on lotus flowers. D1 is in white clothes and white crown, holding a tin stick in his right hand, and holding two long objects over the shoulders in his left hand, suspected to be two locks of long hair, similar to a female monk. D2 is dressed as a monk, with a long robe and wide sleeves, his hands folded together, and his head is gleaming, as if he is a male monk. These two statues should represent the elect of Manichaeism. D1 D2

relief E

- E : Engraved in the middle is a portrait standing on Yunfeng, wearing tight-sleeved plain clothes and short skirts, with exposed hands and feet, resembling a Huren costume. His hands are raised and opened flat, as if holding a torch; the hands are also tied with a fluttering silk ribbon, which "flutters" a specific pattern on both sides of the portrait. According to research, the statue is related to the Manichaeism worshiping light. link

== See also ==
- Cao'an
- Cangnan Stele
