= Dunhuang Manichaean texts =

The Dunhuang Manichaean texts refers to three Manichaean manuscripts of the Tang dynasty found in the Buddhist scripture cave of Mogao Grottoes in Dunhuang.

- Chinese Manichaean hymn scroll
- Incomplete scripture of Manichaeism
- Manichaean Compendium
- Irk Bitig a Turkic divination text written in the Old Turkic script. May have been used syncretically by manichaeans

== See also ==
- Turpan Manichaean texts
