= Qianku =

Chinese town in Zhejiang

Qianku 钱库
- Town
- Location in Zhejiang
- Coordinates: 27°28′59″N 120°34′03″E
- Country: China
- Province: Zhejiang
- Prefecture: Wenzhou
- County: Cangnan

Population
  - Total: 65,000

Qianku is a town under the jurisdiction of Cangnan County, Wenzhou City, Zhejiang Province, People's Republic of China. Located in the center of Jiangnanyang Plain in Cangnan County, with an area of 62.86 square kilometers and a population of 127,000 (2017), it has jurisdiction over Yangtou, Qianqianjin, Hengjie, Dongxi Street, Jinjiayang, Sanshiqiao communities, Xiakou and Xiangqiao, Xin'an, Xianju, Kuoshan, Chengnan, Chengbei districts, a total of 47 administrative villages.

Qianku is most well known for its pleasant climate, environment and dense river network. Geographically, it is connected to Longgang City in the east, Wangli Town in the west, Yishan Town in the north, and Jinxiang Town and Chixi Town in the south. Existing Longjin Avenue and G1523 Ningbo-Dongguan Expressway. 228 National Highway, S216 Lin'an-Cangnan Expressway, Rui-Cang Expressway Qianku Section are under construction.

Qianku Town was selected as the fourth batch of provincial-level small city cultivation pilot towns in Zhejiang Province, and successively won the luggage industry production base (national gold name card), China's comprehensive utilization of waste textile pilot base, Wenming Town, Zhejiang Province, Zhejiang Province Educational Strong Town, Zhejiang Province Provincial Sports Town, Zhejiang Province Ecological Civilization Town, Zhejiang Science Popularization Demonstration Town, Zhejiang Province-level Central Town, Zhejiang Province "New Countryside Impact Broadcasting" TV boosts ten characteristic towns, Zhejiang Province Happy Small Towns, Zhejiang Province Health Towns, Honorary titles such as Forest Towns in Zhejiang Province. In November 2020, Qianku Town became the fourth batch of small cities cultivation pilot in Zhejiang.

== History ==
As early as the Qianyou period of the Hou Han Dynasty (948-950 AD), the king of Wuyue Qian Hongchu once set up a coffer here to levy local taxes on tea, salt, cotton, and silk. In the early years of the Republic of China, the Qianku District was established, and it was originally called "Qianku".

In 2019, Qianku Town covers an area of 62.89 square kilometers, governs 6 communities, 7 districts, and 47 administrative villages.

== See also ==
- Cangnan County
- Cangnan Stele
