= Lin Deng =

Manichaean leader

- Traditional Chinese: 林瞪
- Simplified Chinese: 林瞪
Transcriptions
Standard Mandarin
- Hanyu Pinyin: Lín Dèng

Lin Deng (Chinese: 林瞪; 1003–1059 in Shangwan Village 上万村, China) was a Chinese Manichaean leader in what is now Shangwan Village 上万村, Baiyang Township, Xiapu County, Fujian Province. Today in Baiyang Township, the Xiapu Manichaean manuscripts are used for rituals conducted for Lin Deng in the three villages of Baiyang 柏洋村, Shangwan 上万村, and Tahou 塔后村.

== Life ==
Born in 1003 during the Northern Song dynasty, Lin Deng was a Fujianese Manichaean who helped established Manichaeism in Fujian during the Song dynasty. In 1027, Lin converted to Manichaeism at the age of 25. Today, Lin's tomb is still revered by locals in Shangwan Village.

Lin Deng was the disciple of Sun Mian 孙绵, who founded Longshou Temple 龙首寺 in 966, located about 2 kilometers from Shangwan Village.
