= Xiapu Manichaean manuscripts =

Manichaean manuscripts

The Xiapu Manichaean manuscripts are Chinese Manichaean manuscripts from Shangwan Village 上万村, Baiyang Township, Xiapu County, Fujian Province, China. They first became known to academia and the general public in October 2008. Today in Baiyang Township, the texts are used for rituals conducted for Lin Deng 林瞪 in the three villages of Baiyang 柏洋村, Shangwan 上万村, and Tahou 塔后村.

Additional Manichaean manuscripts were discovered in neighboring parts of Fujian after 2008. In March 2016, 3 Manichaean texts were discovered in Jianglong Village 降龙村, Shoushan Township 寿山乡, Pingnan County, Fujian, called Zhenming kaizheng wenke 貞明開正文科, Zhenming kaizheng zou 貞明開正奏, and Dier shike 第二時科. In 2017, 35 Manichaean texts owned by Taoist priest Shi Menghua 施孟铧 were discovered in Gaoshan Town 高山镇, Fuqing City 福清市. In 2019, a Manichaean stone inscription was also discovered in nearby Qiyu Village 芹屿村, Yangzhong Town 洋中镇, Jiaocheng District, Ningde City.

== Background ==
The majority of the texts belong to Chen Peisheng 陈培生, a priest or ritual master (fashi 法师) who uses them as ritual texts during his religious ceremonies. Priest Chen Peisheng is the descendant of Chen Pingshan 陈平山, who was a disciple of Lin Deng 林瞪. In Baiyang Township, many local villagers revere Lin Deng 林瞪 (born 1003; died 1059), a Fujianese Manichaean who helped established Manichaeism in Fujian during the Song dynasty. In 1027, Lin converted to Manichaeism at the age of 25. Today, Lin's tomb is still revered by locals in Shangwan Village.

Lin Deng himself was the disciple of Sun Mian 孙绵, one of the ancestors of the Sun 孙 clan in Chanyang Village 禅洋村 (now Shenyang Village 神洋村) who founded Longshou Temple 龙首寺 in 966, located about 2 kilometers from Shangwan Village. During the Yuan dynasty, the temple was renamed as Leshantang 乐山堂 (also called Gaizhutang 盖竹堂). It was destroyed by a typhoon in 2006. In Xiapu County, there are ruins of two Manichaean pagodas, one called the Triple Buddha Pagoda (Sanfota 三佛塔; built in the early 1520s, located in Shangwan); the other called the Flying Road Pagoda (Feiluta 飞路塔; built in 1374, located in Baiyang Township). The Flying Road Pagoda is notable for the inscription qingjing guangming dali zhihui 清淨 光明 大力 智慧 ‘Purity, Light, Great Power, Wisdom’.

Moni Guangfo (摩尼光佛, meaning ‘Mani, Buddha of Light’) is one of the longest Xiapu manuscripts. The manuscript includes 83 pages, 659 lines, and over 8,400 Chinese characters in total.

In comparison with older forms of Manichaeism and other previously known forms of Chinese Manichaeism, the Xiapu Manichaean texts strongly emphasize the worship of Jesus (Yishu 夷數).

== List of texts ==
A tentative list of texts, the majority of which belong to ritual masters (fashi 法师) Chen Peisheng 陈培生 and Xie Daolian 谢道琏 in Baiyang Township, given by Gábor Kósa (2014:13-14) is as follows. Most were transcribed during the Qing dynasty from older sources. The contents of the text date back to over 1,000 years ago.

| Title | Pages | Era | Custodian | Notes |
|---|---|---|---|---|
| Gaoguang wen 《高廣文》 | 4 pages | Qing | Chen Peisheng | |
| Mingfu qing fo wen 《冥福請佛文》 | 14 pages | Qing | Chen Peisheng | |
| Leshantang shenji 《樂山堂神記》 | 10 pages | Qing | Chen Peisheng | |
| Mingmen chu chuanqing benshi 《明門初傳請本師》 | 17 pages | Qing | Chen Peisheng | |
| Jie xizhang wen 《借錫杖文》 | 4 pages | Qing | Chen Peisheng | |
| Jie zhu wen 《借珠文》 | 3 pages | Qing | Chen Peisheng | |
| Fu xizhang ji 《付錫杖偈》 | 1 page | Qing | Chen Peisheng | |
| Poyu haoliao song xizhang ji 《破獄好了送錫杖偈》 | 1 page | | Chen Peisheng | |
| Siji zan 《四寂贊》 | 2 pages | Qing | Chen Peisheng | |
| Song sanjie shenwen 《送三界神文》 | 4 pages | Qing | Chen Peisheng | |
| Moni guangfo 《摩尼光佛》 | 82 pages | | Chen Peisheng | |
| Song fo zan 《送佛贊》 | 3 pages | Qing | Chen Peisheng | |
| Song fo wen 《送佛文》 | 8 pages | Qing | Chen Peisheng | |
| Zou shen die shu kece 《奏申牒疏科冊》 | 70 pages | Qing | Xie Daolian | two copies |
| Diandeng qiceng kece 《點燈七層科冊》 = Gongde zouming zoudie 《功德奏名奏牒》 | | | Xie Daolian | |
| Xiongke kan Zhenmingjing biyong ci wen 《凶科看貞明經畢用此文》 | 4 pages | Qing | Chen Peisheng | |
| Xingfuzu qingdan ke 《興福祖慶誕科》 (Ritual Manual for the Celebration of the Birthday of the Ancestor of Promoting Well-being) | 34/30 pages | Qing/recent | Chen Peisheng | two copies |
| Moni shishi mifa 《摩尼施食秘法》 | | | Chen Peisheng | |
| Menying keyuan 《門迎科苑》 | | copy from 1715 | | |
| Jixiang daochang shen han die 《吉祥道場申函牒》 | 90 pages | Qing | Chen Peisheng | |
| Jixiang daochang menshu 《吉祥道場門書》 | | copy from 1786 | | |
| Yushu 《雨疏》 or Dao yu shu zou shen die 《禱雨疏奏申牒》 | | | | |
| Jiaoping qing zhi biao 《繳慿請職表》 | | | | |
| Qusha fu 《去煞符》 | 1 page | | | |
| Wuming kewen 《無名科文》 | 163 pages | | Xie Daolian | various untitled texts |

Chapters in Xingfuzu qingdan ke 《興福祖慶誕科》 are:

1. Qi dasheng 《起大聖》
2. Kaitan wen 《開壇文》
3. Jingkou wen 《净口文》
4. Jingtan wen 《净壇文》
5. Tiannü zhou 《天女咒》
6. Qing hufa wen 《請護法文》
7. Qing sanbao 《請三寶》
8. Wufang jiantan lushi zhouyu 《五方建壇路師咒語》
9. Zhaofu guanwen 《召符官文》
10. Song tudi zan anwei 《誦土地讚安慰》
