= Chinese Manichaeism =

Form of Manichaeism practiced in China

Monijiao
- 摩尼教
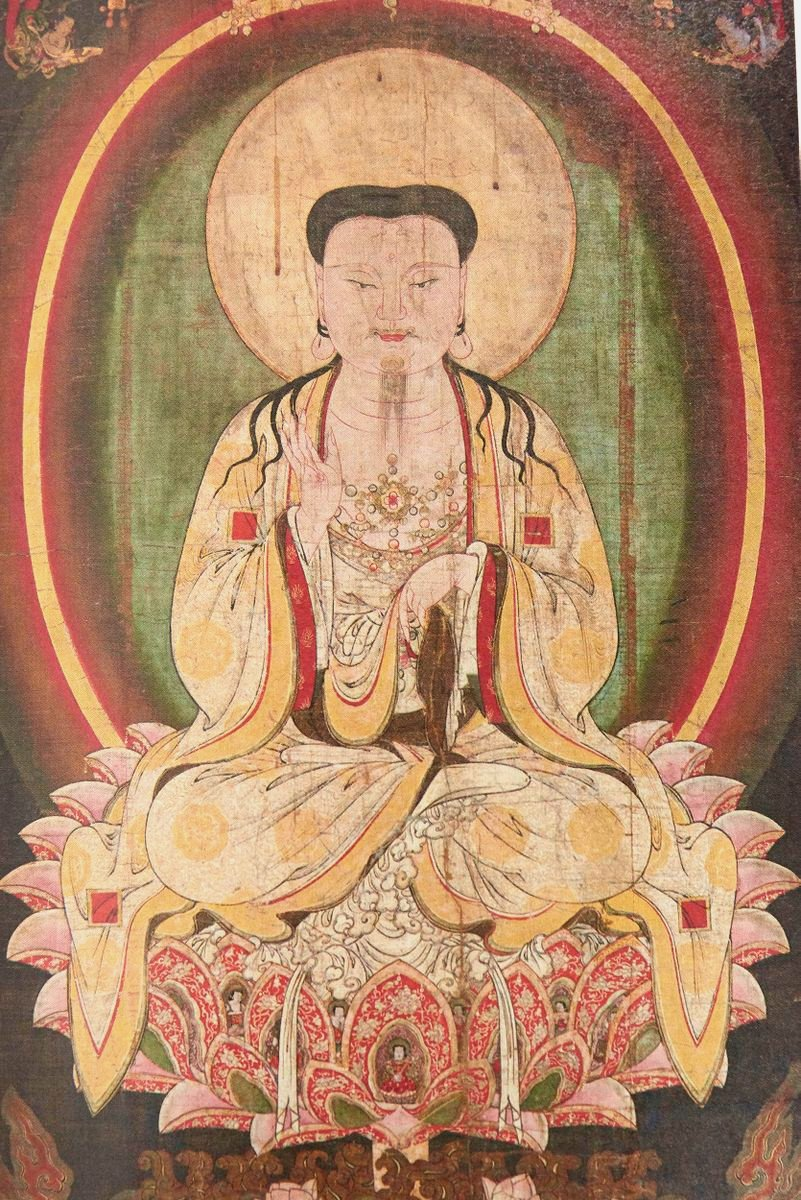
- Mani on a hanging scroll, c. 14th/15th century.
- Language: Chinese
- Origin: c. 10th century
- Branched from: Manichaeism
- Separations: Maitreyanism, White Lotus

Chinese Manichaeism, also known as Monijiao (Chinese: 摩尼教; pinyin: Móníjiào; Wade–Giles: Mo^{2}-ni^{2} Chiao^{4}; lit. 'religion of Moni') or Mingjiao (Chinese: 明教; pinyin: Míngjiào; Wade–Giles: Ming^{2}-Chiao^{4}, lit. 'religion of light' or 'bright religion'), is the form of Manichaeism transmitted to China. Chinese Manichaeism rose to prominence during the Tang dynasty and despite frequent persecutions, it has continued long after the other forms of Manichaeism were eradicated in the West. The most complete set of surviving Manichaean writings were written in Chinese sometime before the 9th century and were found in the Mogao Caves among the Dunhuang manuscripts.

Chinese Manichaeism represents a set of teachings with the purpose of inducing awakening (佛; fó). It is a dualistic religion that believes in the eternal fight between the principles of good/light and evil/darkness, the former being represented by a God known as Shangdi, Míngzūn (明尊; 'Radiant Lord') or Zhēnshén (真神; 'True God'). Salvation is delivered by the Living Spirit (淨活風; Jìnghuófēng) of God, of whom there have been many manifestations in human form, including Mani (摩尼; Móní).

== History ==
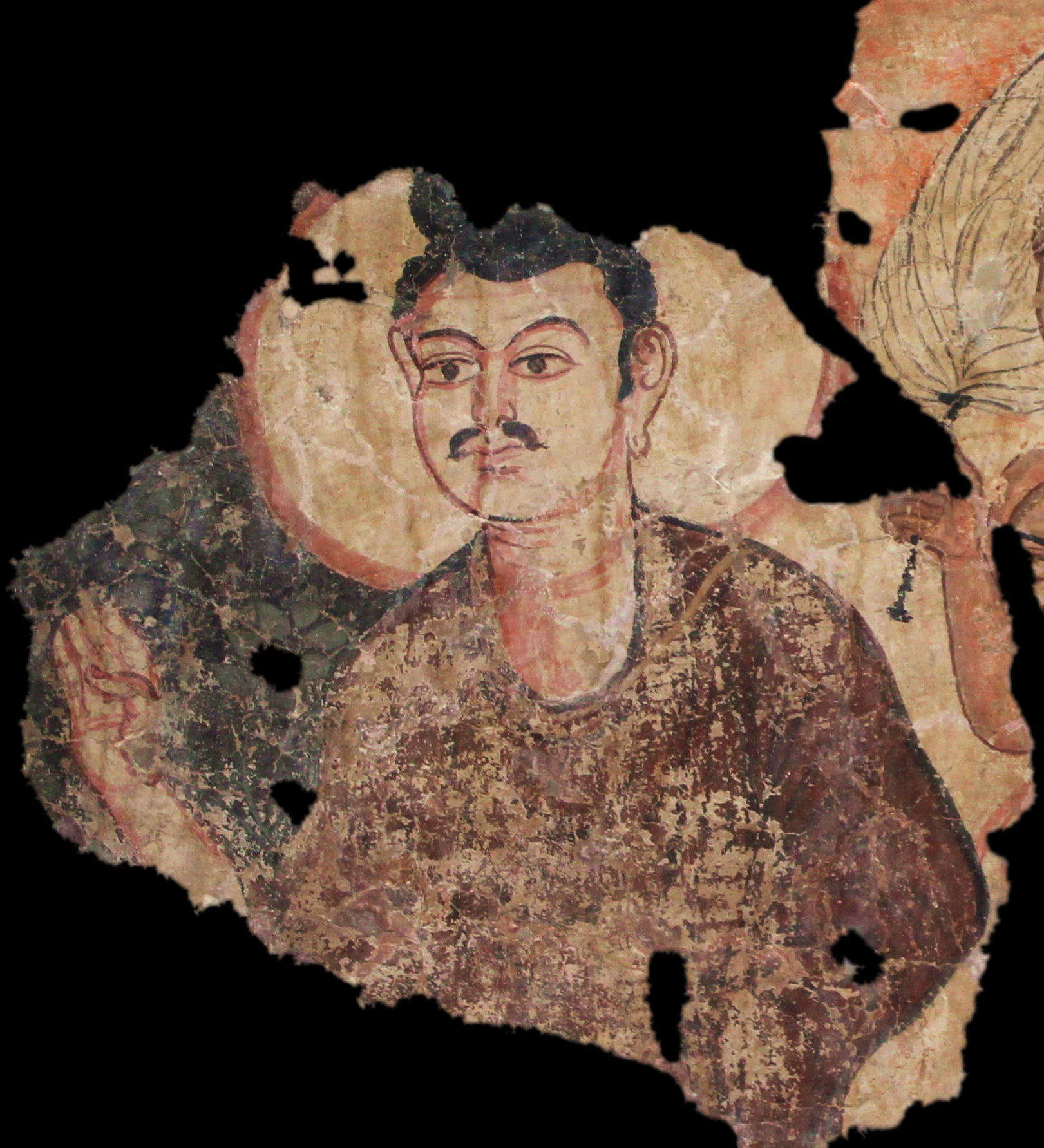
Detail of a fresco depicting the Buddha from the Silk Road town of Miran, along the same route that Manichaeism spread into China

Due to how adaptable the teachings and beliefs of Manichaeism are, they were able to spread across a vast expanse of different cultures, from the Roman Empire to the west and China to the east. The religion arrived alongside Christianity through the various south-eastern Chinese seaports and overland Silk Road trade routes from the western desert regions. Sources state that Manichaeism was first introduced into China in 694, but this may have occurred much earlier. Since its introduction, Manichaeism has been deeply sinicised, adapting to the Chinese cultural context.

According to the Chinese Manichaeans of the Ming dynasty, their religion entered the country via Mōzak during the reign of the Emperor Gaozong of Tang (650–683). Pupil of Mōzak Bishop Mihr-Ohrmazd followed his leader into China and was granted an audience with Wu Zetian (who held de facto power in the Tang dynasty between 684 and 690, and ruled as emperor of the Wu Zhou dynasty from 690 to 705) where, according to later Buddhist sources, he presented the Shabuhragan, which ended up becoming the most popular text of the country's Manichaeans. In 731, Emperor Xuanzong of Tang asked a Manichaean to summarize their foreign religious doctrines, and the result was a text known as the Compendium of the Teachings of Mani, the Awakened One of Light. The text interprets the prophet Mani as an incarnation of Laozi (although Manichaeans clashed with the local Chinese Buddhists, they maintained good relations with their Taoist neighbors); a version of the Taoist Huahujing from the 8th century shares the same perspective as the Compendium, stating that Laozi reincarnated among the Western barbarian peoples as the prophet Mani.

=== Tang dynasty ===
Manichaeism was introduced into China during the Tang dynasty through Central Asian communities and was regarded as an improper form of Buddhism by the Tang authorities. Although religions of the Western peoples (including those of Bactria and Sogdia) were not outlawed, they were prohibited from spreading among the native Chinese population. However, Manichaeism was a popular faith in northern China during the Tang dynasty.

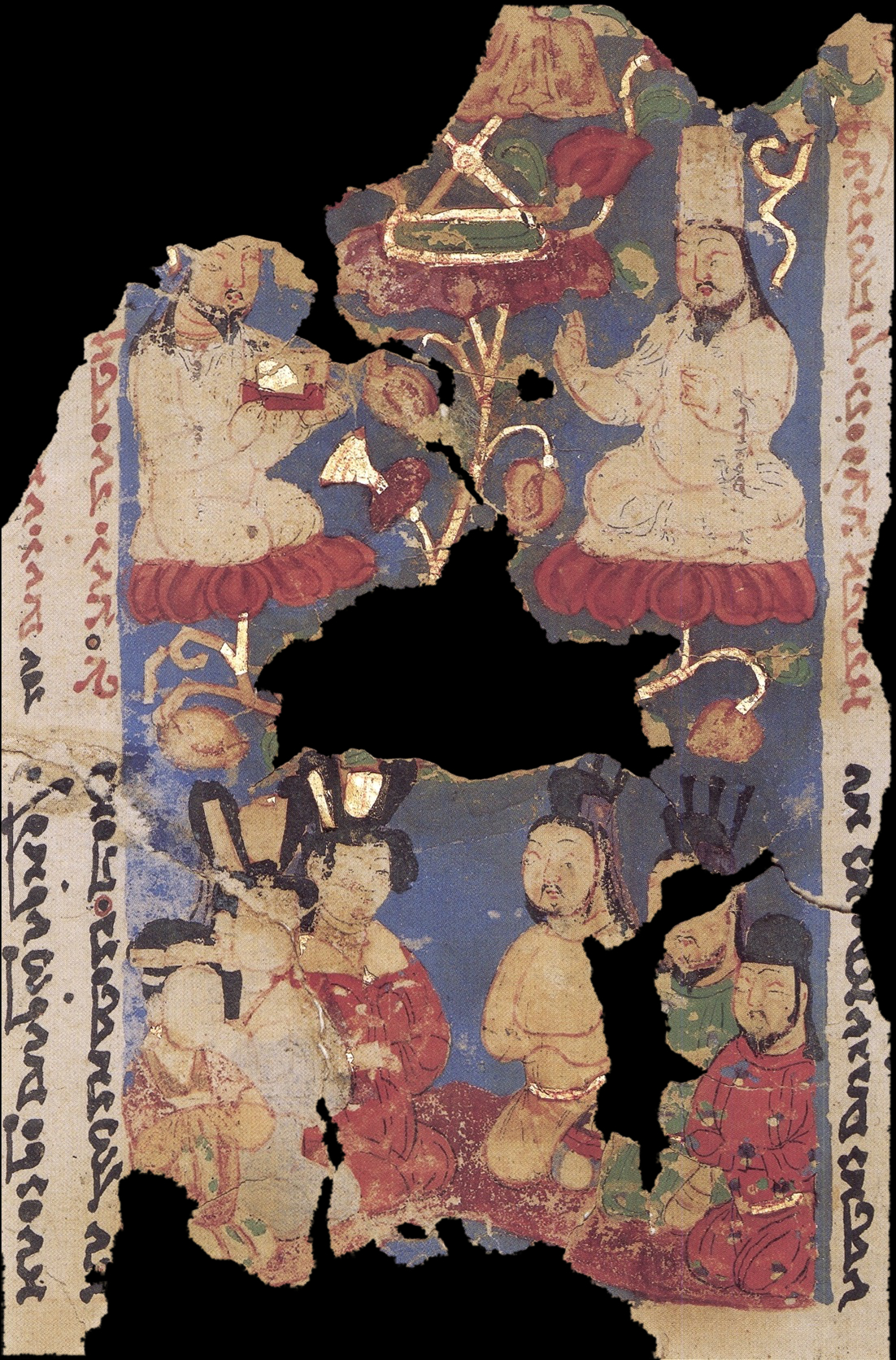
Fragment from a Manichaean text depicting a "Sermon Scene" in the Uyghur Manichaean style

The north-western Uyghur Khaganate learned of Manichaeism from Sogdian foreigners. After Khagan Bögü Qaghan (759–780) held a three-day discussion with members of the Manichaean clergy, he converted to the religion in 763. Manichaeism subsequently became the official religion of the khaganate, prompting the Babylonian headquarters of Manichaeism to send high-ranking clerics to the northwestern Uyghur territory. Due to the peace between the Uyghurs and Han populations during this time, the Tang government relaxed its restraints on Manichaeism, allowing it to flourish with monasteries built by the Uyghurs in places such as Shaoxing, Yangzhou, Nanjing, and Jingzhou, with the first being built in 768.

=== Persecution ===
The years of prosperity for Manichaeism came to an end in the wake of the Kyrgyz defeat of the Uyghur Khaganate in 840 and a rising resentment for non-Chinese foreigners. Manichaeism was officially banned and persecuted during the Great Anti-Buddhist Persecution started by Emperor Wuzong of Tang in 843. During that year, the Tang dynasty government confiscated all of the property belonging to the Manichaean monasteries, destroyed the temples, burnt their scriptures, laicized or killed the clergy, and specifically executed seventy Manichaean nuns in Chang'an.

Instead of their traditional clothing, the Manichaean priests were ordered to wear hanfu, as the typical Manichaean attire was deemed un-Chinese. In some cases, the Manichaeans were ordered by Tang authorities to dress like Buddhist monks and, since Manichaean priests were known for their long hair, they were forced to have their heads shaven. Over half of the Manichaean population is estimated to have been killed due to Emperor Wuzong's Great Anti-Buddhist Persecution. Two years after the persecution began, a total ban on foreign relations caused Manichaeism to hide underground, from which it has never regained its past prominence.

=== Song and Yuan dynasties ===
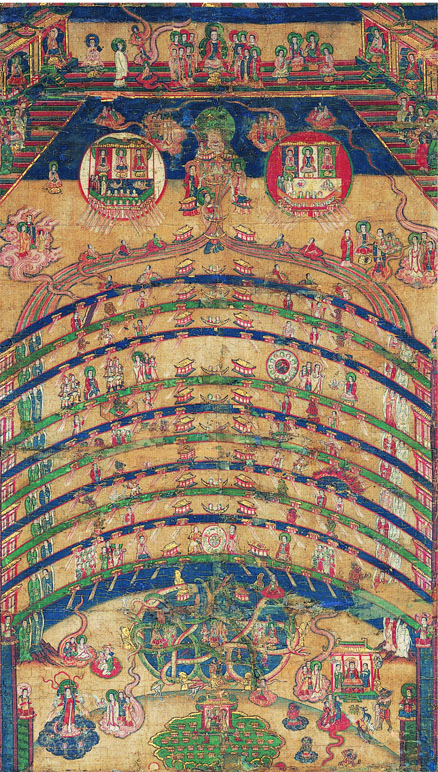
Detail of the Yuan-era Manichaean Diagram of the Universe silk painting

Though they participated in rebellions against the government during the Song dynasty, the Chinese Manichaeans were continually stamped down by the successive Chinese dynasties, with the Confucian authorities of the Song era disregarding the local Manichaeans as "vegetarian demon-worshippers" (Chinese: 吃菜事魔). During this time, they had a holy book that discussed the natures of light and dark, as well as the past, present, and future, which were viewed as separate worlds. Manichaeans of this era were buried naked, "would not touch liquor...[,] eat meat, [and would not consume] milk and cheese" and did not worship the Buddha, according to Dun J. Li.

Manichaeans' fortunes changed during the Mongol-led Yuan dynasty, wherein the religion enjoyed a stable existence while the Sakya sect of Tibetan Buddhism served as the de facto state religion. Two elaborate silk paintings survive from this era: Manichaean Diagram of the Universe and Sermon on Mani's Teaching of Salvation.

=== Further syncretization ===
Manichaeism survived among the population and had a profound influence on the tradition of the Chinese salvationist religions, integrating with the Maitreya teachings such as the White Lotus Societies. Chinese Manichaeism took inspiration from Taoism, as well as forms of Buddhism, including Chinese Buddhism.

Due to the rise of the Ming dynasty, the name for Manichaeism, Mingjiao, was seen as offensive to the emperor, leading to particular persecution. During and after the 14th century, some Chinese Manichaeans involved themselves with the Pure Land school of Mahayana Buddhism in southern China. Those Manichaeans practiced their rituals so closely alongside the Mahayana Buddhists that, over the years, the two sects became indistinguishable. The Cao'an temple in Fujian stands as an example of this synthesis, as a statue of the "Buddha of Light" is thought to be a representation of the prophet Mani.

=== Present-day ===
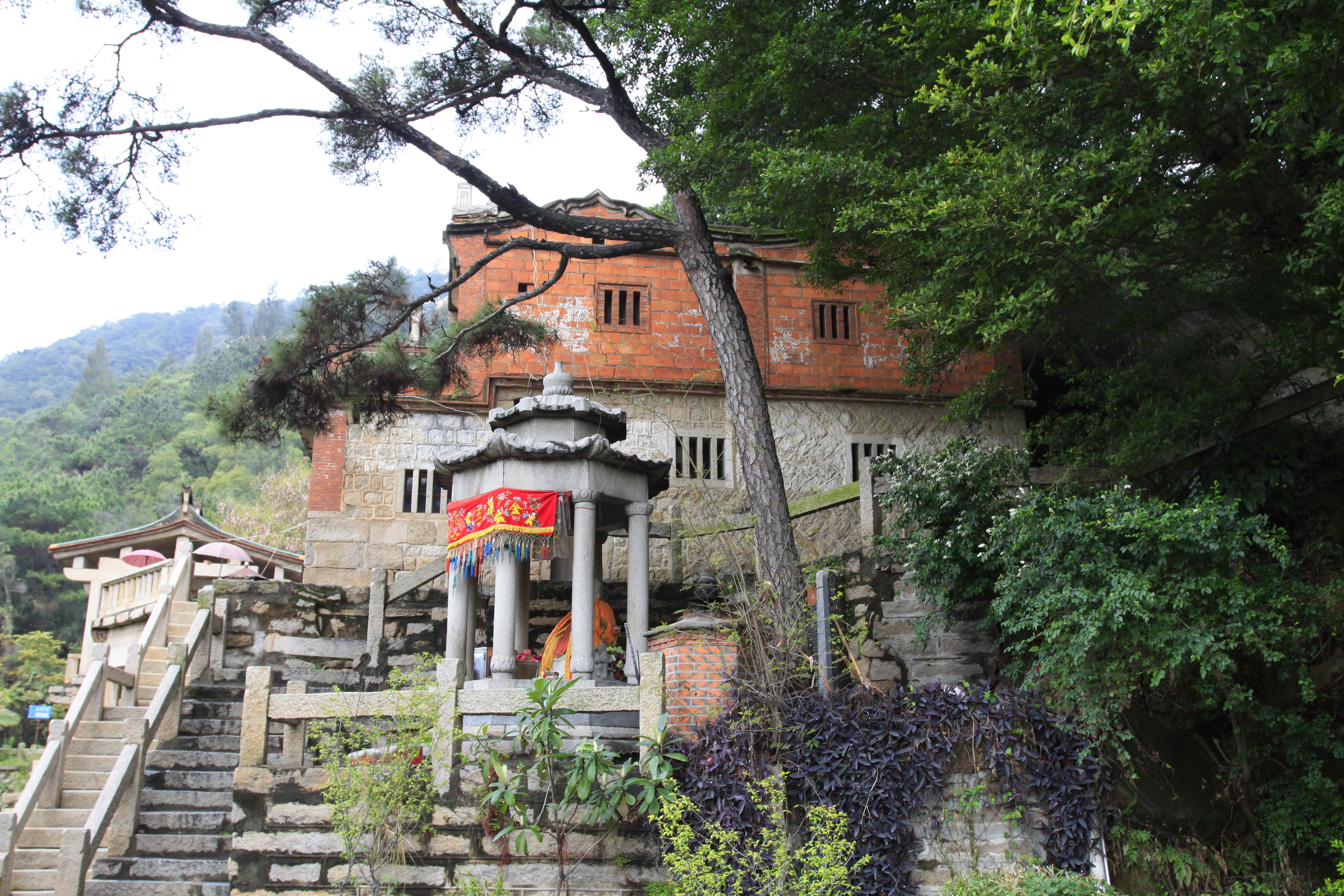
Cao'an ("Thatched Hut") in Jinjiang, Quanzhou, Fujian.

Cao'an, founded as a Manichaean temple but later associated with Buddhism, has survived to the present day. It features a statue of Mani as the "Buddha of Light". Local villagers near Cao'an still worship Mani, albeit with little distinction between Mani-as-Buddha and Gautama Buddha.

In 2018, rituals were conducted for Lin Deng 林瞪 (1003–1059), a Chinese Manichaean leader who lived during the Song dynasty in the three villages of Baiyang 柏洋村, Shangwan 上万村, and Tahou 塔后村 in Baiyang Township, Xiapu County, Fujian.

== Texts ==
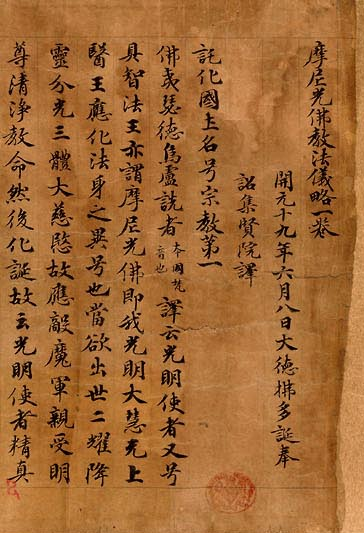
Opening lines of the Compendium

Although there is no shortage of documentation of Manichaeism in southern China (mostly in the form of highly critical books about the religion), doctrinal and liturgical writings remain rare. Nearly all present knowledge of the beliefs and teachings of Chinese Manichaeism (including its presence in the Tarim Basin region) draws from three texts compiled before the end of the 9th century: the Traité, the Hymnscroll, and the Compendium.

Besides a few absent opening lines, the Traité (Chinese: 摩尼教殘經; pinyin: Móníjiào cán jīng; lit. 'fragmentary Manichean scripture') is in excellent condition and corresponds with Manichaean texts found in other languages. Within the Traité are discourses attributed to Mani in response to questions from a disciple (named "A-to" or "Addā") on the nature of Manichaean cosmogony and ethics. The first discourse primarily concerns the creation of the universe, the salvation of primal man by the powers of light, a subsequent attack by the prince of darkness, and the eventual triumph of light over darkness. Themes such as the symbol of trees and the enumeration of nights and days are found in other Western Manichaean texts, namely those written in the Coptic language. More precise parallels can be drawn between the fragments of Turkic Manichaean texts. In 1983, Werner Sundermann detailed how twenty-two Parthian manuscripts served as the original compositions of the texts, which were subsequently translated into Turkish and Sogdian, and then one of those Central Asian translations served as the basis for the Chinese language versions.

The Hymnscroll (Chinese: 下部讚; pinyin: Xiàbùzàn; lit. 'the lower (second?) section of the Manichean hymns') consists of thirty hymns that were likely directly translated from Parthian into the Chinese language, as several of the hymns are phonetic transcriptions of the original Parthian hymns, unintelligible to the common Chinese reader. The scroll finishes with an appeal for blessing. The text indicates that it was translated and compiled in Turfan. The Compendium (Chinese: 摩尼光佛教法儀略; pinyin: Móní guāng fójiào fǎ yí lüè; lit. 'outline of the teachings and rules of Mani', 'Buddha of Light') begins with an account of Mani's birth that is directly based on the life of the Buddha and then provides a summarization of Manichaean doctrines. The text opens with a paragraph that explains how the text was ordered by the Tang dynasty on July 16, 731, and in a later passage mentions how Mani was a reincarnation of Lao Tzu.

The discovery of the Xiapu Manichaean manuscripts was made known to the public in October 2008. The texts are used for Manichaean rituals in Baiyang Township, Xiapu County.

== Artwork ==
Painting is a Manichaean tradition that traces its roots back to Mani himself (Arzhang), who elevated art-making to the esteem of the divine spirit, believed that meditating on beauty brought one closer to God, and ultimately saw the practicality of pictures as a transcultural method of teaching. Just as the pristine-condition Manichaean texts come from Chinese Manichaeism, so, too, do the remaining examples of Manichaean artwork, in the forms of fragments and full hanging-scrolls.

== See also ==
- Cao'an
- Ming Cult
- Chinese Buddhism
- Chinese folk religion
- Chinese ritual mastery traditions
- Chinese salvationist religions
- Great Anti-Buddhist Persecution
- Manichaean Diagram of the Universe
- Manichaean Painting of the Buddha Jesus
- Sermon on Mani's Teaching of Salvation
- Xiapu Manichaean manuscripts
