= Mar Adda =

Manichaean missionary

Mar Adda (Chinese: 末阿达), was one of the twelve apostles of Mani, the founder of Manichaeism, the year of birth and death is unknown.

Dispatched by Manichaeus, Morada, who was the bishop at the time, entered Roman Empire to spread Manichaeism. Apostle Pattīg and Gabryab were walking with him. Pattig returned to Mani in Mesopotamia a year later, and Mani sent three more clerks to bring "The Gospel of Life" And the other two scriptures to Malada. Morada continued Patig's mission and continued to preach in the Roman Empire. He established many monasteries, selected many elect and hearers, wrote some essays, and used wisdom as a weapon to argue with believers of other religions. He converted many people to Manichaeism in Alexandria, where he performed miracles. Mar Adda cured Nafšā (Nafšā) in Palmyra, so that she and her sisters and family, Queen Tadī and her husband, the lord of Palmyra, Septimi Septimius all converted to Manichaeism.

The timing of Mar Adda's activities in the Roman Empire is still uncertain. Some scholars believe that it was between 244 and 261-262 AD, or alternatively around 241 AD.

Mar Adda is not mentioned much in the Eastern Manichaean Church, but it also occupies an important position. In the Dunhuang manuscript, "Incomplete scripture of Manichaeism" begins with Mar Adda asking Mani about the origin of the world.

== See ==
- Manichaeism
- Mani
- Mar Sisin

== Bibliography ==
- See also Hegemonius, Acta Archelai, ed. C. H. Beeson, Leipzig, 1906, pp. 5.5, 22.4, 93.16.
- P. Alfaric, Les écritures manichéennes, Paris, 1918, pp. 104–05.
- R. Jolivet and M. Jourjon, eds., Oeuvres de Saint Augustin 17: Six traités manichéennes, Paris, 1961, pp. 203–05
- O. Klima, Manis Zeit und Leben, Prague, 1962, pp. 498–99.
- J. P. Asmussen, Xuāstvānīft, Copenhagen, 1965, p. 21.
- W. Sundermann, Mitteliranische manichäische Texte kirchengeschichtlichen Inhalts, Berliner Turfantexte XI, Berlin, 1981, pp. 25ff., 34ff.
