= Cangnan Stele =

Manichaean monument in Zhejiang, China

Record of Chosen Temple
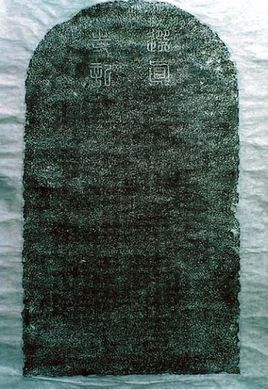
- Rubbings of the stone stele of "The Notes of Selected Temples"
- Material: stone
- Size: height 150 cm, width 76 cm, thickness 10 cm
- Writing: Traditional Chinese
- Created: 1351
- Present location: Cangnan County Museum

The Cangnan Stele is the temple stele of the Yuan Dynasty Manichaean monastery Xuanzhen Temple (选真寺). It is the only Manichean stone monument found in the world so far. The stele has been listed in China as a national second-class cultural relic, now in the Cangnan County Museum, in Zhejiang Province. The monument is 150 cm high, 76 cm wide, and 10 cm thick, half on the forehead of the round stele; the inscription is inscribed in seal script, "Xuansiji". Lin Wushu called the Xuanzhen Temple according to the inscription "It was built by the church of the neighboring countries of Jiangsu, and was built before the Gai Peng family." It means that the Mingjiao of Xuanzhen Temple still inherits the tradition of Manichaeism in the Tang Dynasty, influenced by foreign religions, and is different from ordinary folk religions.

== Inscription ==
The full text of the stele:

This documents the advancement of Kong Kebiao, the same merit as an Imperial Scholar, and originated in the record of Jian De; to the work of Dun Wu, the General of Wenzhou Road; Pingyang's judge in Yanjing, Sun Tuan E.

Travel seventy miles south of Pingyang Guo, there is a mountain called Pengshan. It twists and stretches out, embracing the surroundings in a rounded manner. The river meanders around, with the forest and ravines beautiful and lush. The Peng family has lived here for generations. A palace complex stands more than three hundred steps northwest from the Peng family's residence, with a plaque reading "Xuan Zhen Temple". This is where the teacher from Sulin State (蘇鄰國, Suristan) resides. It was built by the Peng family's ancestors. Its construction is simple and rustic, which some people criticize. Peng Jun, like a mountain, told his nephew, De Yu, "The temple was founded by our ancestors. Its size does not adequately reflect our sincerity and seriousness. I am fortunate to continue the legacy of our ancestors. I wish to dedicate my spare strength to this cause. You shall assist me in this task. If our ancestors know this, they will not grieve that their wishes are not being carried on below the earth." De Yu agreed and said, "Yes, I dare not disobey your orders."

They cleared the old site, gathered wood and stone, and assembled artisans to attack it. They built a Buddha hall, established three gates, and set up left and right corridors. All the constructions followed strict regulations. Before long, De Yu died, and Peng Jun grieved. He said, "My nephew is gone. Can my work be completed?" Then he ordered more materials and engineers to continue the construction. He arranged halls for teachings, student housing, rooms for eating and sleeping, as well as kitchens, wells, storehouses, baths and toilets, all properly repaired. He turned it into a spectacular palace, far more grand than its original appearance. Then he said, "Ah, I feared that I might not be able to fulfill the early aspirations of this project. I did not do this to curry favor or profit from the Buddha's field. Now that the work is completed, I hope that the spirits of our ancestors will find this satisfactory."

He then built a shrine to the east of the temple to house ancestral tablets, and allocated a thousand acres of land, offering its profits for sacrifices and other temple expenses. Those who continued De Yu's work included his grandsons: Wen Fu, Wen Ming, Wen Ding, Wen Chong, and Wen Zhen. This spring, Wen Ming came to report on the completion of the temple and requested a written record of it.

Alas! In this world, descendants who can maintain their ancestors' legacies without letting them fall into ruin are rare indeed. It is even rarer to find those who can beautify and expand upon these legacies, let alone devote their energy to construction beyond cultivation and harvest. Seeing your dedication to this temple construction project and your unwavering determination to carry on the legacy of your ancestors, we can see that your family business is thriving. May you enjoy longevity and prosperity! I admire your unfaltering filial piety and have thus written this account to record the merit of your temple construction and your own virtues. You are known as a benevolent elder, with the style name like a mountain. This is written on the 15th day of the second month of the eleventh year of Zhi Zheng.

== See also ==
- Cao'an
- Manichaean stone reliefs of Shangwan village
- Qianku Manicheans
