= Cao'an =

Manichaean temple in Fujian province, China

Coordinates: 24°46′25″N 118°31′47″E

- 草庵
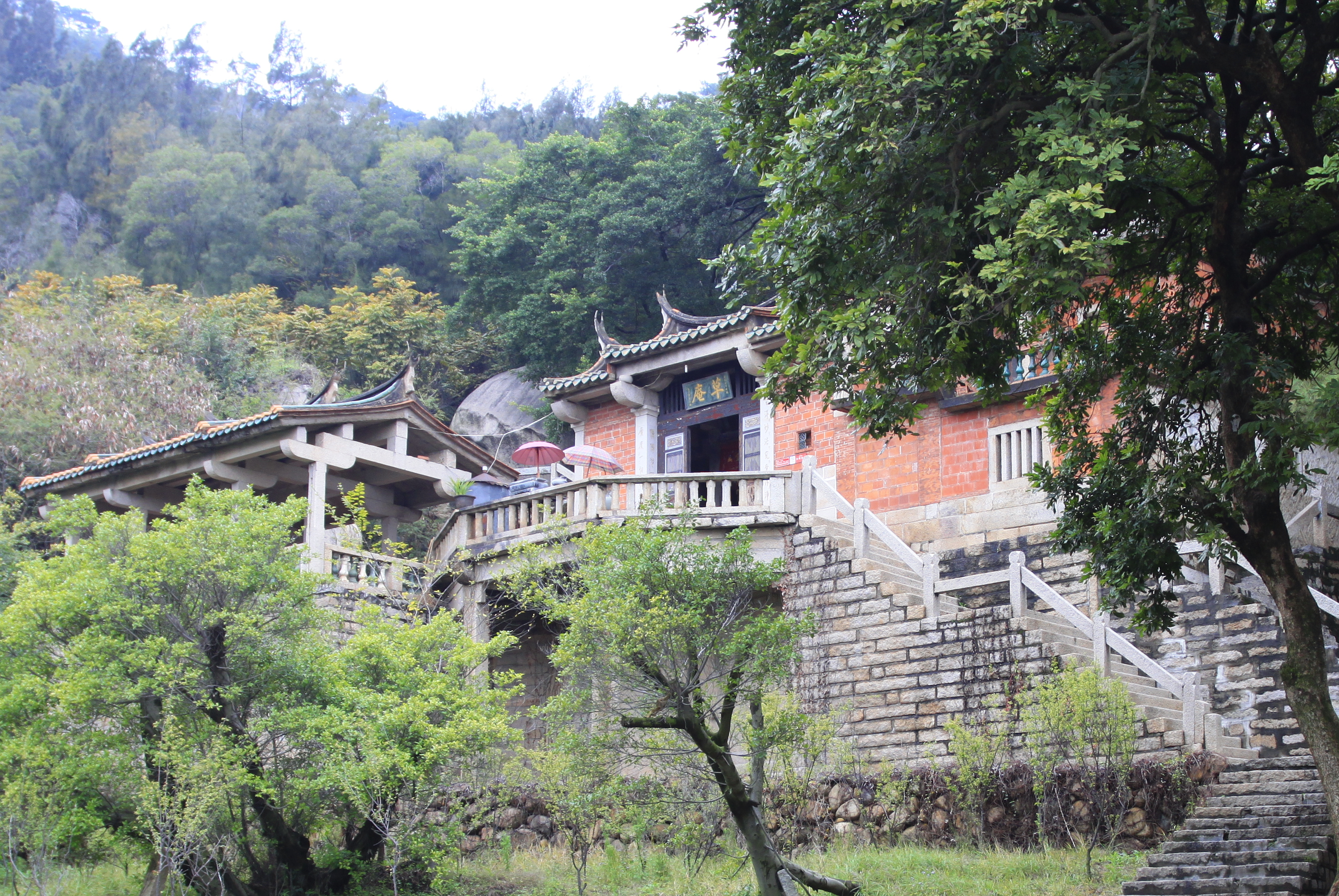

- Location within China

Religion
- Affiliation: Manichaeism
- Province: Fujian
- Deity: Buddha of Light (Mani)

Location
- Country: China

UNESCO World Heritage Site
- Location: China
- Part of: Quanzhou: Emporium of the World in Song-Yuan China
- Criteria: Cultural: (iv)
- Reference: 1561
- Inscription: 2021 (44th Session)

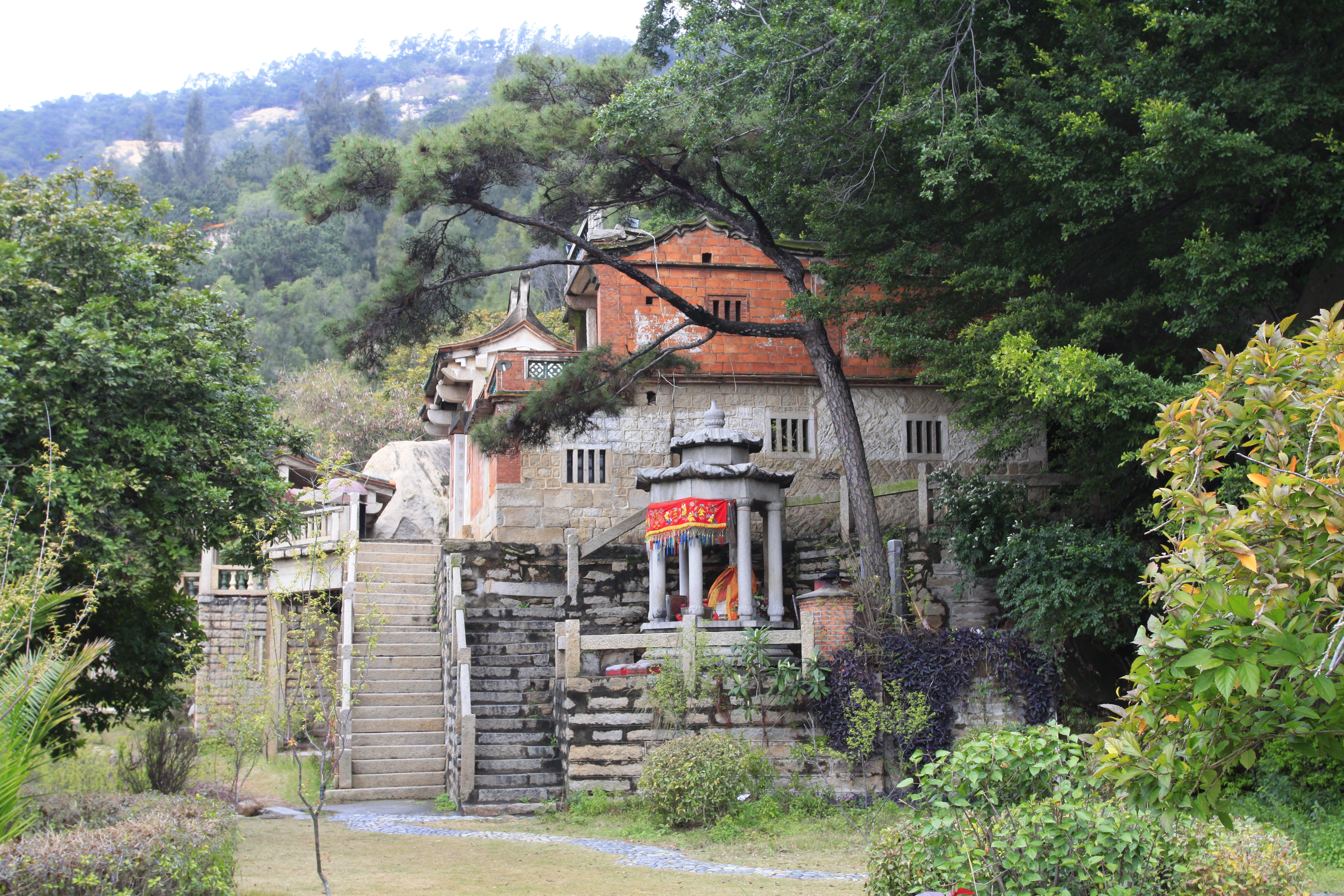
Cao'an Temple seen from the south, with Huabiao Hill in the background

Cao'an (Chinese: 草庵; pinyin: Cǎo'ān; Pe̍h-ōe-jī: Chháu-am; lit. 'thatched nunnery') is a temple in Luoshan Subdistrict, Jinjiang, Fujian. Originally constructed by Chinese Manichaeans, it was considered by later worshipers to be a Buddhist temple. This "Manichaean temple in Buddhist disguise" had historically been seen by modern experts on Manichaeism as "the only Manichaean building which has survived intact". However, other Manichaean buildings have survived intact, such as the Xuanzhen Temple, also in China. In 2021, Cao'an was inscribed on the UNESCO World Heritage List along with many other sites near Quanzhou because of its unique testimony to the exchange of religious ideas and cultures in medieval China. Over 2022, the number of tourists to the location doubled and preservation efforts began.

== Geography ==
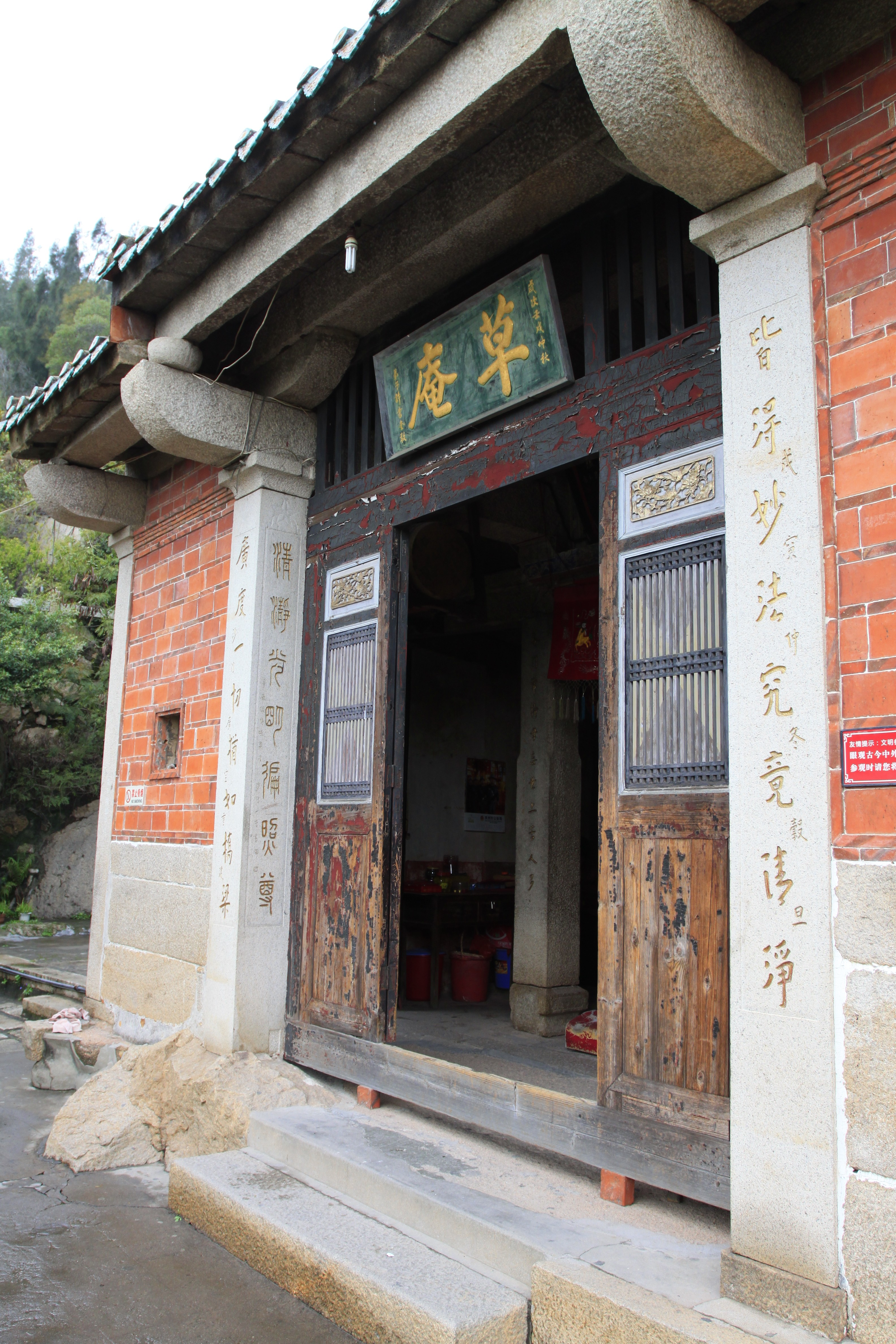
Cao'an Temple main entrance

The temple is located on the southern slope of Huabiao Hill near Shedian Village just west of downtown Jinjiang. Jinjiang is part of Quanzhou, which was known historically as "Quanzhou Prefecture"; the location is some 50 kilometres (31 mi) south of downtown Quanzhou.

He Qiaoyuan (1558–1632) explained in his local history, the Book of Fujian (Chinese: 闽书; pinyin: Mǐnshū), that Huabiao Hill's name comes from the fact that it and the nearby Lingyuan Hill, look like a pair of huabiao.

The temple as it exists today is not too different from a typical Buddhist temple of its region. It is a two-story granite building with the worship space downstairs and living space for a few priests upstairs.

== Background: Manichaeism in Fujian ==
Manichaeism arrived in China in 694 or earlier during the Tang dynasty (618–907). Early on, the Manichaean religion was strongly associated with Sogdian merchants, and, later, with Uyghurs resident in the Tang state. The religion was, however, primarily present in northern and central China (the Yangtze region) at the time and suffered a strong setback during the anti-Manichaean campaign of 843, the prelude to the Great Anti-Buddhist Persecution of 845, when foreign Manichaean priests were exiled or executed.

It was in the 10th century, after the Tang dynasty had fallen, that Manichaeism, now primarily practised by Han Chinese, reached Fujian. Its arrival in the province is linked to a certain Manichaean preacher who fled to Fujian from persecutions in North China, traveled extensively throughout the province, and eventually died and was buried in Quanzhou Prefecture, which thus became one of the centers of Chinese Manichaeism during the Song dynasty.

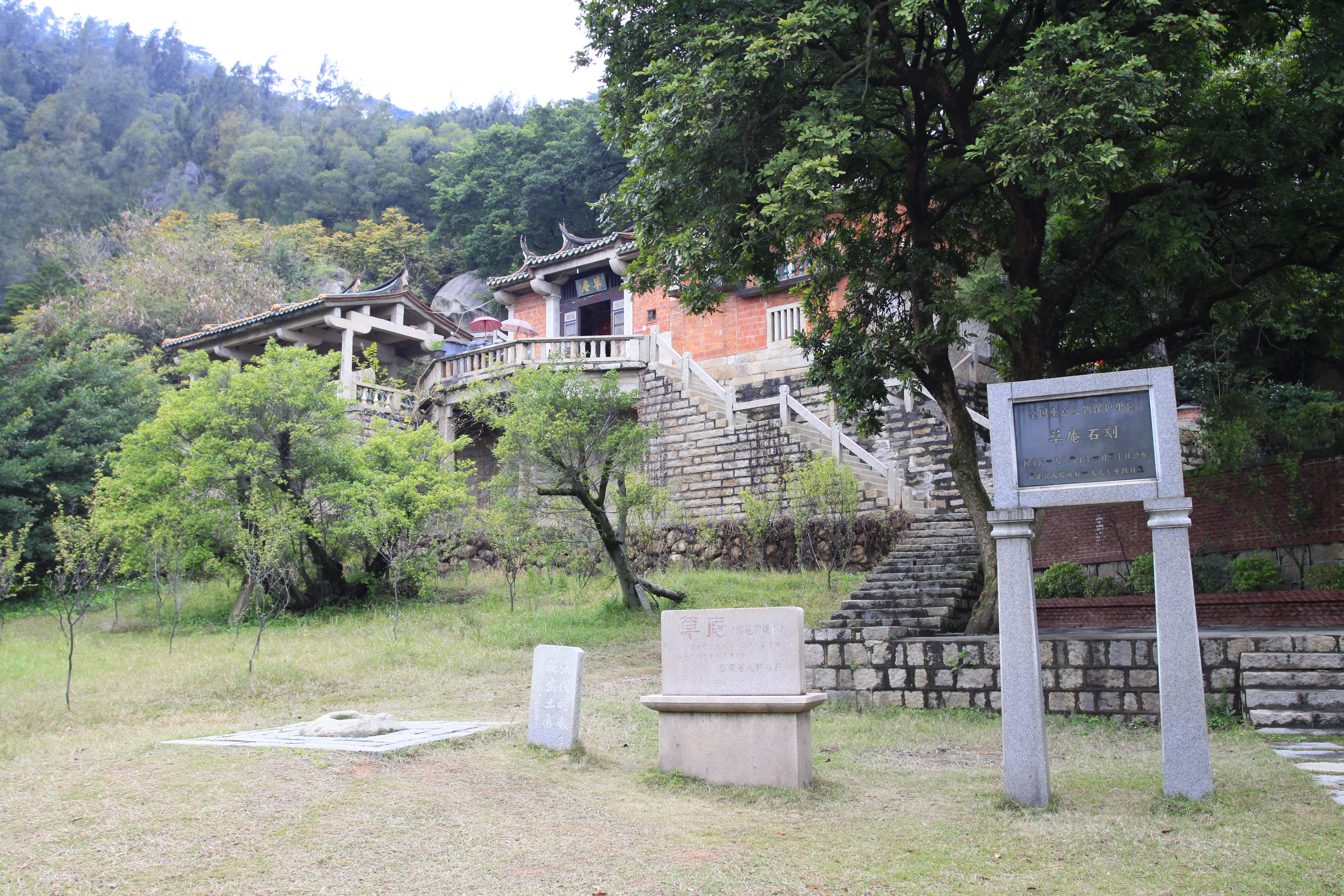
General view of Cao'an Temple

Manichaeism in China assumes certain Chinese characteristics, assimilating to both Buddhism and Taoism. Chinese translations of Manichaean treatises are couched in Buddhist phraseology, and the religion's founder (Mar) Mani (known in China as (末)摩尼, (Mo)-Mani) received the title of the "Buddha of Light" (Chinese: 光明佛 Guangming Fo or 光佛 Guangfo), and a life story resembling that of Gautama Buddha. At the same time, the supposedly Taoist treatise, the Huahujing "Scripture of the Conversion of the Barbarians", popular with Chinese Manichaeans, declared Mani to be a reincarnation of Laozi. As to the Confucian civil authorities of the Song state, when the clandestine cells of Mani's followers came to their attention, they were usually lumped together with assorted other suspicious and potentially troublesome sects as "vegetarian demon worshipers" (Chinese: 吃菜事魔 Chi cai shi mo).

Not surprisingly, such Manichaean temples that were erected in Song China usually had an official Buddhist or Taoist affiliation. There are records, for example, of a Manichaean temple in Taoist disguise at Siming. This temple - one of the northernmost known Manichaean sites of the Song era - was established in the 960s, and was still active - in a more standard Taoist way, but with a memory of Manichaeism retained - in the 1260s.

== History ==
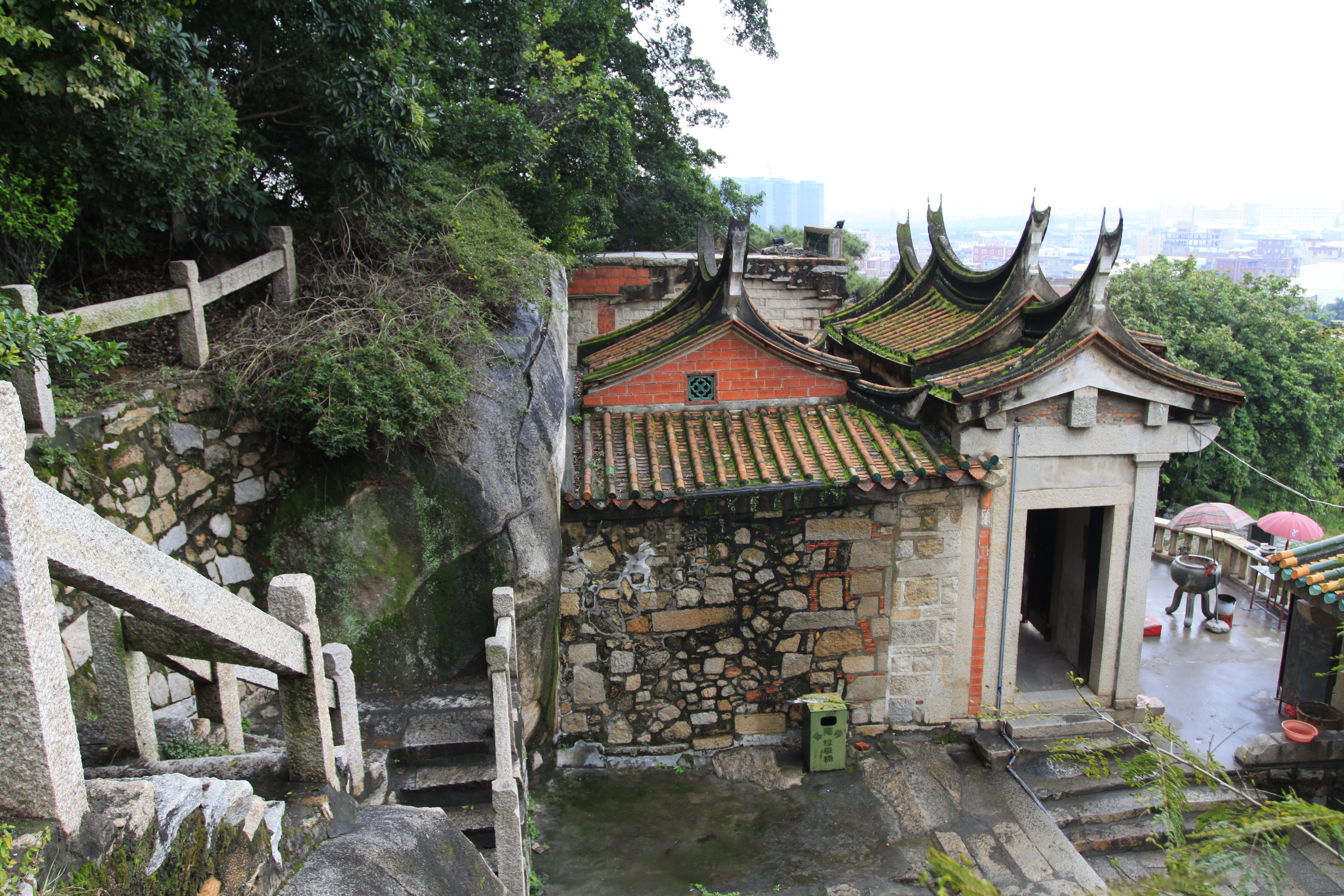
General view of the temple

The temple is said to have been initially constructed during the reign of Emperor Gaozong of Song, the first emperor of the Southern Song (mid-12th century), as a straw hut. It was rebuilt in a more permanent way in the 5th year of the Zhiyuan era of Toghon Temür of the Yuan dynasty (1339).

Manichaeism in China became practically forgotten by non-followers during the close of the Ming dynasty, as the followers of Manichaeaism had intended, in accompaniment with further syncretization with Taoism and Buddhism. Little material is available on the more recent centuries of the religion's existence. A short poem by Huang Fengxiang (d. 1614) tells about his visit to Cao'an Temple, which according to Fengxiang had already been abandoned. The poet mentions Buddhist and Taoist symbols, but shows no awareness on its author's part of the temple's Manichaean origin.

The Quanzhou historian He Qiaoyuan left a short account of the shrine on Huabiao Hill and its Manichaean origin in the Book of Fujian, which also gave him a reason to summarize what little he knew about the Manichaeans. This text is one of the few pieces of literary evidence we have from centuries after the end of the Ming dynasty of Manichaeism in China. He Qiaoyuan speculated that there were still some followers of the "Religion of Light" (Chinese: 明教) in Fujian in his days, but they "[were] not much in evidence" ("不甚显云").

Cao'an was renovated in 1922, becoming an annex of a Buddhist temple complex where the "ancestral teachers of India and China" were venerated; however, that temple complex later fell into disuse as well. As Samuel N. C. Lieu notes, worshipers at the time may have begun to think that the "Moni" moniker in Cao'an inscriptions referred to "[Śākya]muni" ([释迦]牟尼), i.e. Gautama Buddha; this is what the locals told archaeologist Wu Wenliang a few years later as well.

After He Qiaoyuan's account of the Manichaean shrine was brought to the attention of modern scholars in 1923, by Chen Yuan (陈垣) and Paul Pelliot, local researchers started looking for it. After a long search by a number of researchers (frustrated, at one point, by the presence of marauding bandits), it was finally identified with the existing building by the Quanzhou archaeologist Wu Wenliang (吴文良) in 1940, who presented the results of his on-site research in a 1957 publication.

In 1961, the temple was entered on the Fujian provincial list of protected cultural monuments; in 1996, it was added to China's National List of Historical and Cultural Sites, Fujian.

== Statuary and inscriptions ==
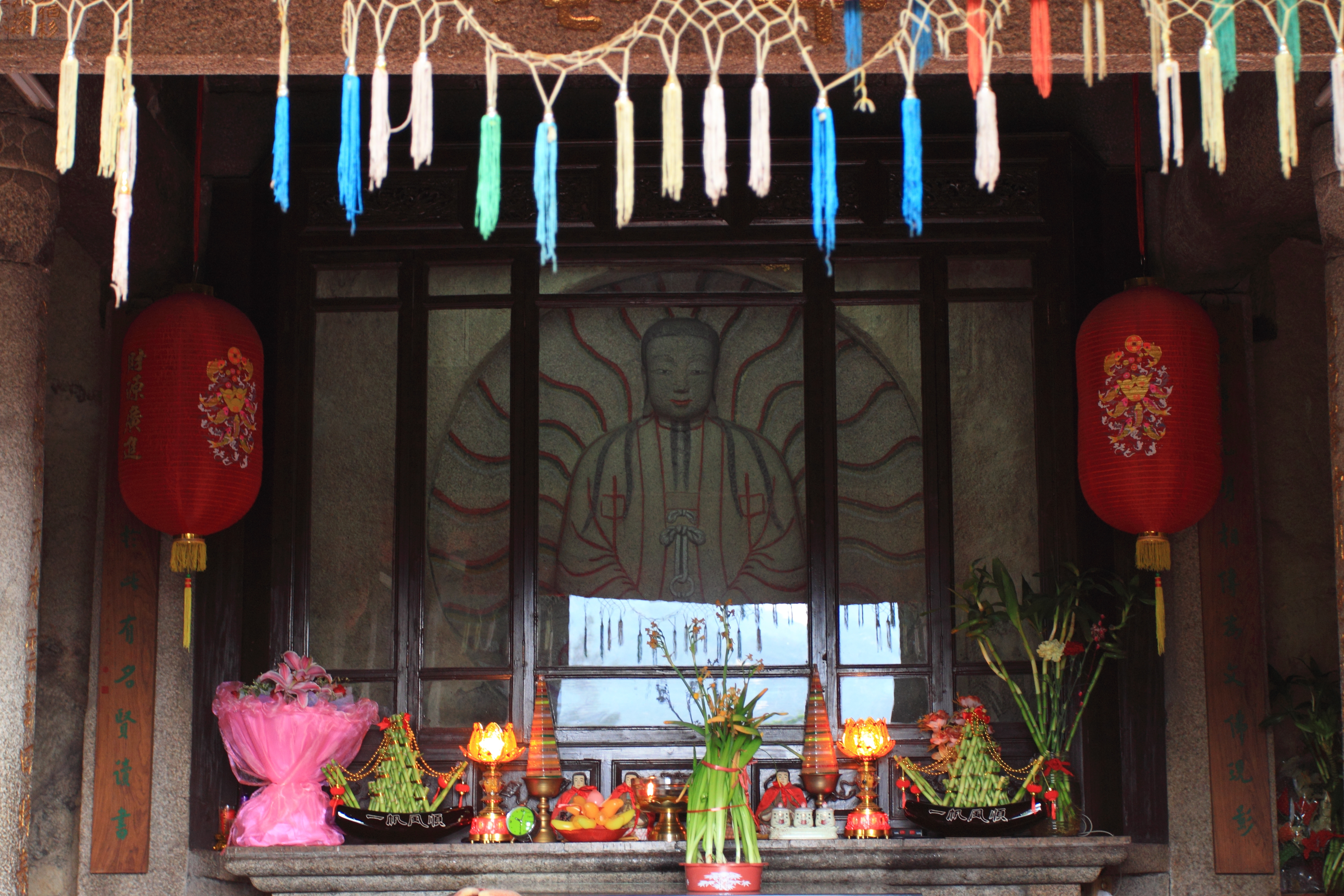
The Buddha of Light (Prophet Mani) carved from the living rock

The most remarkable Manichaean relic in the temple is the statue of Manichaeism's founder Mani, commonly referred to in the Chinese Manichaean tradition as the "Buddha of Light". According to an inscription, the statue was donated to the temple by a local adherent in 1339.

While the statue may look like any other Buddha to a casual observer, experts note a number of peculiarities which distinguish it from a typical portrayal of the Buddha. Instead of being curly-haired and clean-shaven like most other Buddha statues, this Buddha of Light is depicted as having straight hair draped over his shoulders, and sporting a beard. The facial features of the prophet (arched eyebrows, fleshy jowls) are somewhat different from a traditional Chinese stone Buddha as well. It is even said that the stone Mani the Buddha of Light used to have a mustache or sideburns, but they were removed by a 20th-century Buddhist monk, trying to make the statue more like a traditional Buddha.

Instead of looking down, as Buddha statues usually do, the Mani statue looks straight at the worshipers. Instead of being held in a typical Buddhist mudrā, Mani's hands rest on his belly, with both palms facing upward.

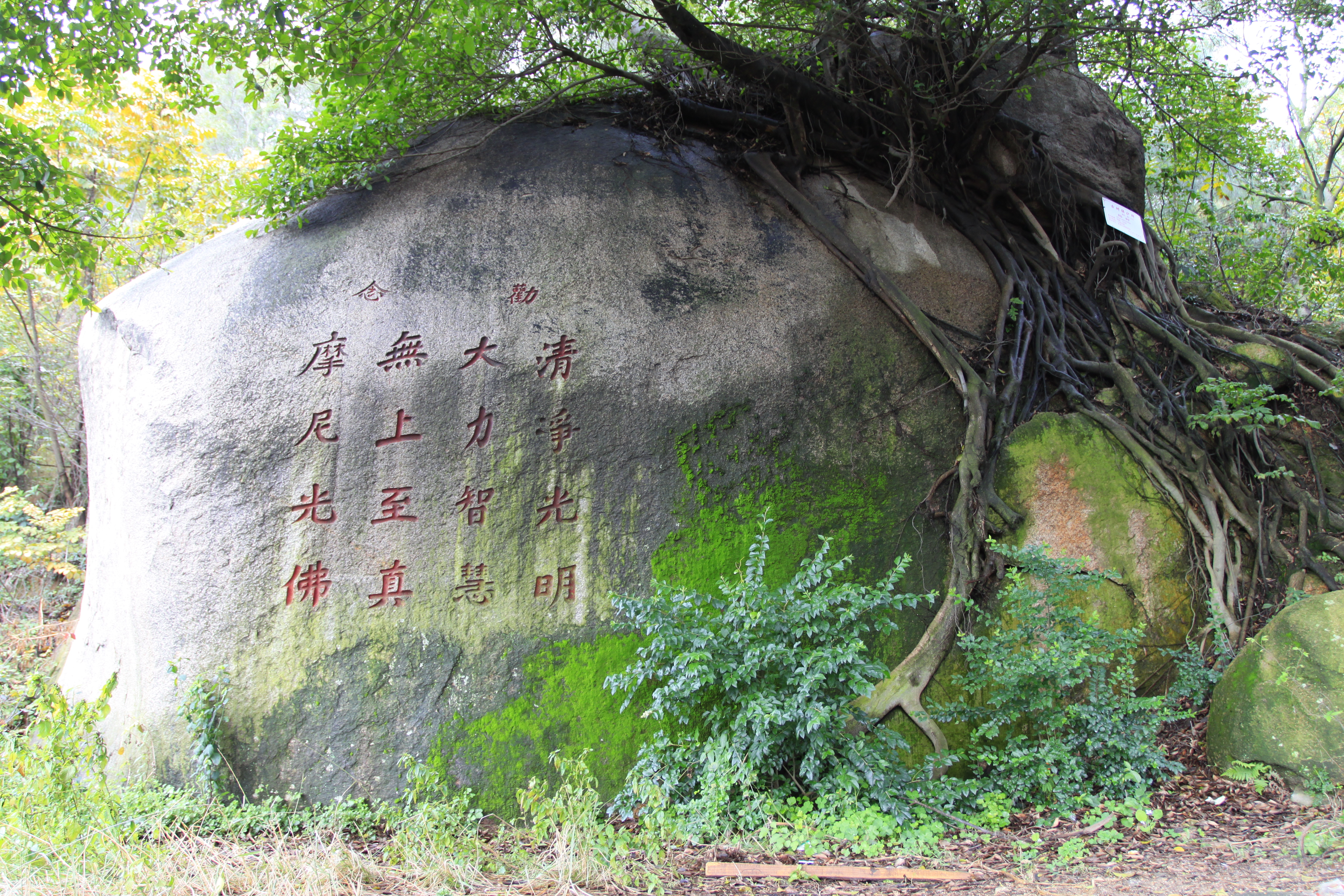
Restored inscription urging the faithful to remember "Purity (清净), Light (光明), Power (大力), and Wisdom (智慧)", and "Moni (摩尼) the Buddha of Light (光佛)"

In order to give the statue an overall luminous impression, the sculptor carved its head, body, and hands from stones of different hues.

Instead of a nianfo phrase, universally seen in China's Buddhist temples, an inscription on a stone in the courtyard dated 1445 urges the faithful to remember "Purity (清净), Light (光明), Power (大力), and Wisdom (智慧)", which are the four attributes of the Father of Light, one of the chief figures of the Manichaean pantheon. These four words (eight Chinese characters) were apparently an important motto of Chinese Manichaeism; it is described as such in an anti-Manichaean work by the Fujianese Taoist Bo Yuchan (real name Ge Changgeng; fl. 1215). The original inscription was destroyed during the Cultural Revolution, but later "restored" (apparently, on another rock).
