= Yishan, Cangnan County =

Yishan 宜山
- Town
- Location in Zhejiang
- Coordinates: 27°31′01″N 120°32′27″E
- Country: China
- Province: Zhejiang
- Prefecture: Wenzhou
- County: Cangnan

Yishanzhen (Chinese: 宜山镇) is a town in China. It is located in Zhejiang Province, in the eastern part of the country, about 310 kilometers south of the provincial capital Hangzhou. The population is 56,008, consisting of is 26,805 women and 29,203 men. Children under 15 years make up 16.0%, adults 15-64 years 77%, and older people over 65 years 6.0%.

Around Yishanzhen it is densely populated, with 762 inhabitants per square kilometer. The nearest major community is Jinxiang, 11.5 km southeast of Yishanzhen. The area around Yishanzhen consists mostly of agricultural land.

The average annual rainfall is 2,019 millimeters. The wettest month is June, with an average of 275 mm of rainfall, and the driest is January, with 66 mm of rainfall.
