= Xiabuzan =

Manichaean document

- Material: paper
- Writing: Middle Chinese
- Created: Tang Dynasty
- Discovered: 1907 in Dunhuang Mogao Caves Buddhist scripture cave
- Present location: LondonBritish Library
- Identification: S.2659

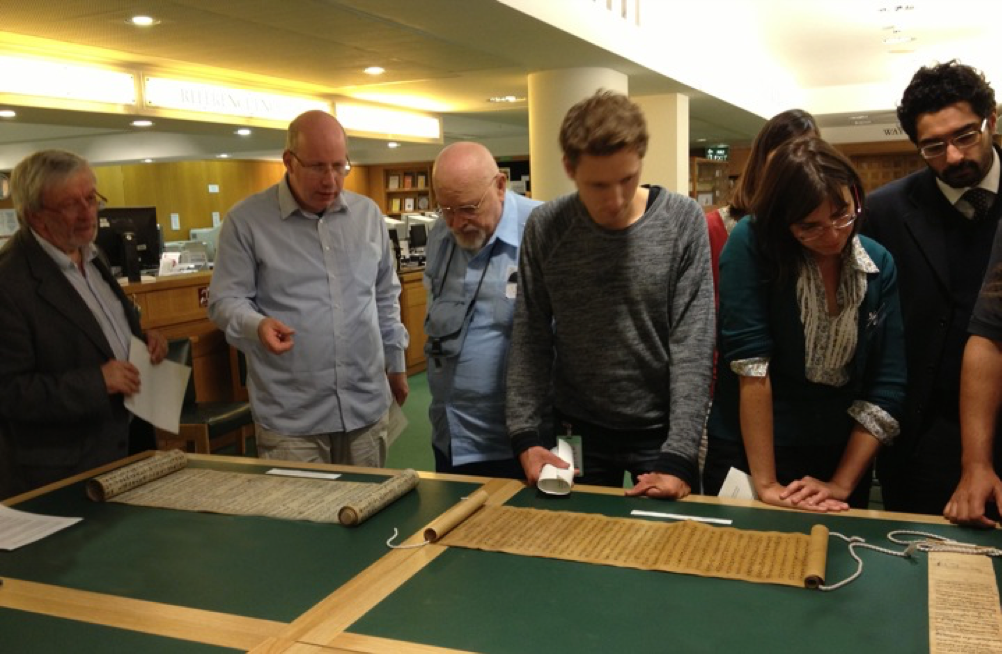
Scholars looking at the manuscripts of "Xiang Zhan" (left) and "Mani Light Buddhism Rules" in the British Library.

The Xiabuzan (Chinese: 下部讚) is a Chinese Manichaean hymn scroll found by British archaeologist Aurel Stein in the Mogao Grottoes. It contains a series of hymns used in religious ceremonies. It is currently held at the British Library, where it is catalogued as number S.2659.

== Introduction ==
The first volume of the manuscript is slightly incomplete, and the content is written in the form of poetry. Among them, there are 1254 sentences of seven-character poems, and a few four-character and five-character poems. According to Lin Wushu's research, these hymns were translated from a Middle Iranian language, rather than original by the Manichaeans. Many of the contents are dedicated to the Yishu (Jesus), and the hymn to the highest deity of Manichaeism.

== In the 'Praise Jesus' text ==
After Manichaeism was introduced into China, because the image of Jesus was quite unfamiliar to Chinese culture, missionaries combined it with Buddhist imagery, called Jesus Buddha, and made him a model of great mercy and relief. Therefore, believers wrote in the following excerpt from the hymn "Praise Jesus Text", which is like a Buddhist scripture in the Chinese Manichaean hymn scroll.

The Buddha-Jesus, who is the most powerful and compassionate person in the world, forgives my sins.
Listen to my painful words and lead me out of the sea of poisonous fire. I wish to give the fragrant water of liberation, the twelve jeweled crowns and the drapes. To cleanse me from the dust of my wonderful nature, and to adorn my pure body to make it upright. May I be rid of the three winters and three poisonous knots, and the six thieves and six poisonous winds. Let the great dharma spring glorify my nature, and let the trees of nature and flowers flourish. May the great waves of fire and the dark clouds and fogs be quenched. Let the great dharma day shine brightly, so that my mind may always be pure. May I be relieved of the disease of dumbness and blindness, and of the monsters and devils. Send down the great Dharma medicine for speedy healing, and silence the divine incantation to drive away the spirits. I have been subjected to so many obstacles and countless other hardships. In view of this, the great sage should forgive me and save me from all the disasters.
May Jesus have mercy on me and free me from all demonic bonds.

== See also ==
- Chinese Manichaeism
- Manichaean Compendium
- Fragmented pages of Manichaen manuscripts
