= Manichaean Compendium =

Tang manuscript on Manichaeism

Maniguang Buddhist rituals
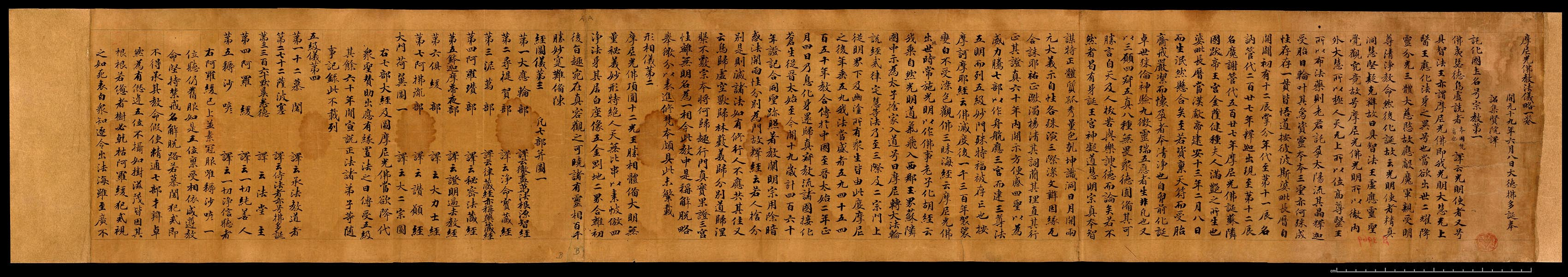
- Above: "Yilue" first volume; Bottom: "Yilue" second volume

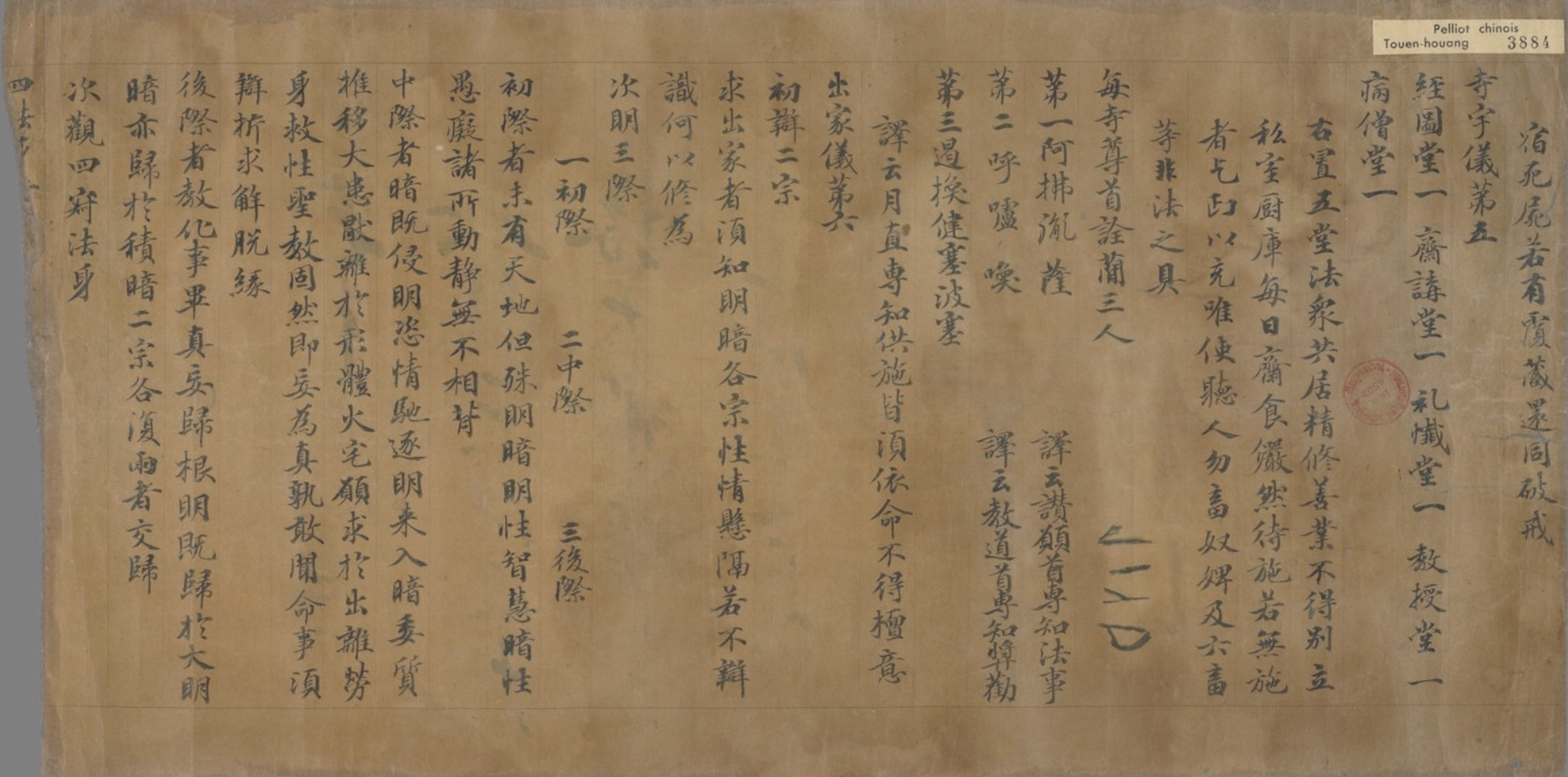
- Material: paper
- Writing: Middle Chinese
- Created: 731 AD
- Discovered: In Dunhuang Mogao Cave Buddhist scripture cave in 1907 and 1908 respectively
- Present location: The first volume is located in London British Library; the second volume is located in Paris French National Library
- Identification: Volume up: S.3969; Volume down: P.3884

The Manichean Compendium is a Manichaean manuscript found in the Mogao Caves. It is a manuscript expounding the doctrine of Manicheaism. It was written in the reign of Emperor Xuanzong of Tang by the Persian missionary Fuduo in 731. It briefly summarizes the basic teachings and rituals of the religion, and is an introductory document for understanding Manichaeism.

== Introduction ==
The manuscript is divided into two volumes. The first volume was discovered by Hungarian British archaeologist Aurel Stein in 1907. It is now in London British Library. It is glued on three pieces of paper. The length is about 150 cm. The writing department The height is about 21.4 cm. The second volume was acquired by French orientalist Paul Pelliot in 1908, now in the collection of Paris French National Library, the entire volume is on one paper, length 52 cm, height 26.2 cm, The writing part is about 21.4 cm high.

After investigating the content and historical background of "Yilue", Lin Wushu believes that the manuscript is not a translation, but a doctrinal explanatory essay written directly in Chinese by Fengzhao. There are 6 chapters in the full text: "Tuohua Land Title Religion No. 1", "Shaping Apparatus No. 2", "Jingtu Apparatus No. 3", "Five Level Apparatus No. 4", "Temple Yuyi Apparatus No. 5", "Monk Ritual sixth". The first 4 chapters are written in the first volume, and the last 2 chapters are in the second volume. The seventh chapter has completely fallen off except for part of the title. The title may be "Four Laws and Seventh", so the content is unknown. The full text mainly introduces the founder (teacher) Mani of the church, the church's scriptures, sect system, temple architecture, organizational structure and basic doctrines. Obviously, the author tried to give a comprehensive introduction to Manichaeism. Therefore, this manuscript is undoubtedly the most valuable original document for studying Manichaeism.

== See also ==
- Chinese Manichaean hymn scroll
