= Baiyang Township =

Baiyang 柏洋乡
- Subdistrict

Chinese transcription(s)
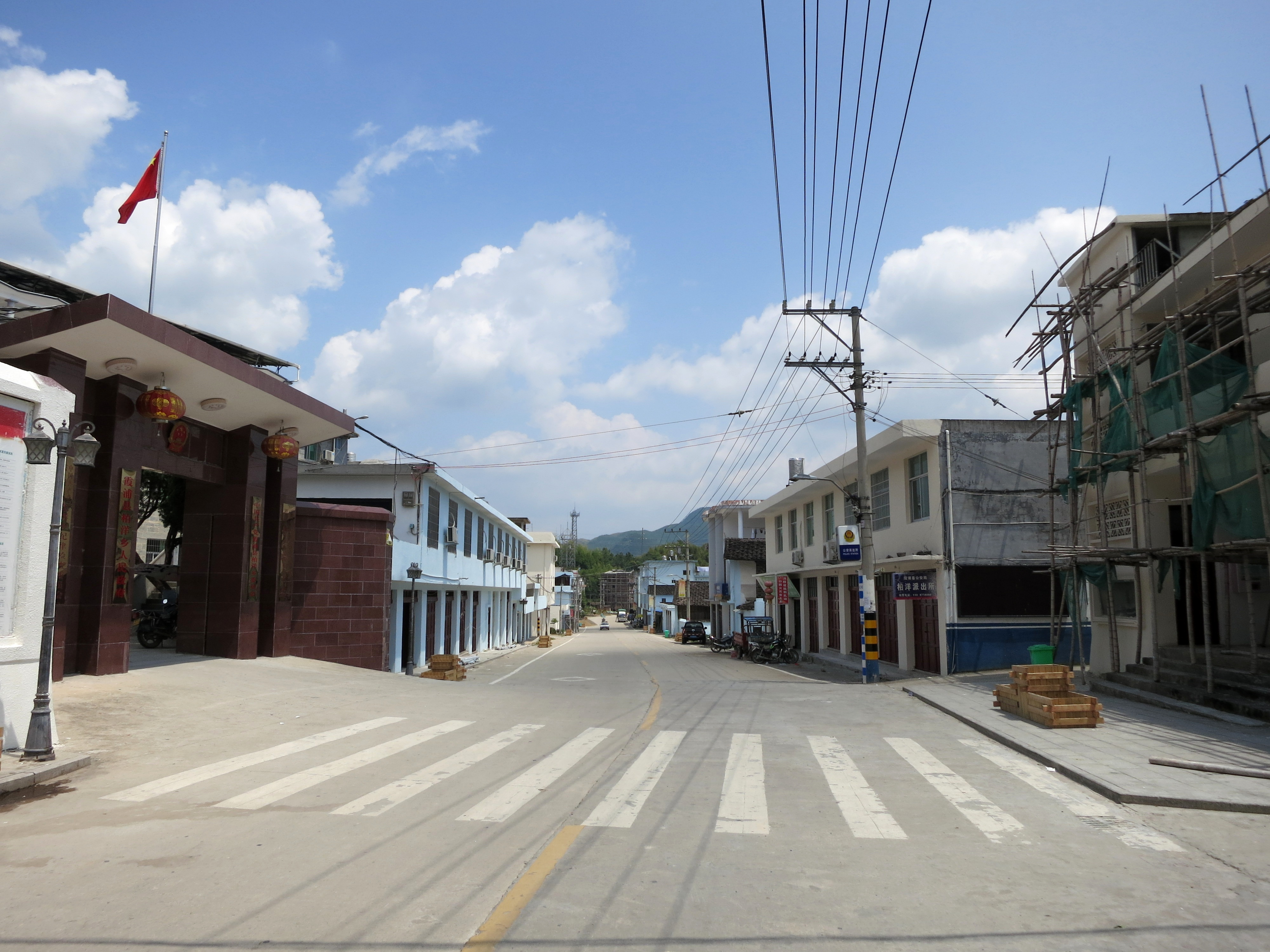
- Panoramic view of Baiyang Township
- Interactive map of Baiyang
- Country: China
- Province: Fujian
- Prefecture: Ningde
- County: Xiapu
- Time zone: UTC+8 (China Standard Time)

Baiyang Township (Chinese: 柏洋; Pe̍h-ōe-jī: Pe̍eh-iôⁿ) is a township -level administrative unit under the jurisdiction of Xiapu County, Ningde City, Fujian Province, People's Republic of China. In 2017, the administrative area was 17,289 hectares, and the permanent population was 10,676.

Baiyang Township is located in the northwest mountainous area of Xiapu County.

== Climate ==
Baiyang belongs to the sub-hot monsoon humid climate area, with an average elevation of 440 meters, an average annual precipitation of 1,550 mm, and an average annual temperature of 16 degrees Celsius. It is rich in natural resources. There are currently 200,000 mu of forest, with a forest coverage rate of 76%, 8,000 acres of bamboo, 5,000 acres of fruit trees, and 15,000 acres of tea gardens. It is one of the main tea producing areas in Xiapu County. Tea such as "Muhai Maojian", "Jiangsu Fried Green", and "Zhu Cha" are sold at home and abroad; mineral resources include kaolin, granite, etc., especially "diabase" is rich in reserves and excellent in texture; the Qianyang River basin runs through the territory, The hydropower reserves are large, and it is urgent for people of insight to invest and develop.

== History ==
In 1990, Baiyang Township was located in the northwestern part of the county, adjacent to Shuimen Township to the east, Chongru Township to the south, Zherong and Fuding counties to the north, and Fu'an City to the west, with an administrative area of 174.6 square kilometers. There are Baiyang, Changyan, Linyang, Chexia, Zhengjiashan, Chendun, Xiedun, Dongdun, Yangzhong, Daling, Ruanyang, Kengkou, Zhoucuokeng, Wuyang, Hengjiang, Bantou, Qian Zhai, Xizhai, Zhetou, Nanshanhou, Fengyang, Chanyang, Huangtuqiu, Tahou, Xikeng, Houlong, Yangli, Daijiashan 28 administrative villages, under the jurisdiction of 303 villager groups, 212 natural villages. The township people's government is in Baiyang Village.

== Subdivisions ==
Baiyang Country has jurisdiction over the following areas:

Baiyang Village, Changyan Village, Linyang Village, Chexia Village, Zhengjiashan Village, Chendun Village, Xiedun Village, Dongdun Village, Yangzhong Village, Zetou Village, Nanshanhou Village, Fengyang Village, Chanyang Village, Dai Jiashan Village, Huangtuqiu Village, Tahou Village, Xikeng Village, Daling Village, Ruanyang Village, Kengkou Village, Zhoucuokeng Village, Wuyang Village, Hengjiang Village, Bandou Village, Qianzhai Village, Xizhai Village, Houlong Village and Yangli Village.

== Manichaean manuscripts ==
The Xiapu Manichaean Manuscripts in Baiyang Township have been passed down for generations but became known to the public since 2008.
