= Nitropelagi =

Scientific classification
- Domain: Bacteria
- Kingdom: Pseudomonadati
- Phylum: Pseudomonadota
- Class: Alphaproteobacteria
- Order: Rhodobacterales
- Family: Rhodobacteraceae
- Genus: Nitropelagi; Jeong & Lee, 2016
- Species: N. marinus

Binomial name
- Nitropelagi marinus Jeong & Lee, 2016

Genus of bacteria

"Nitropelagi" is a Gram-negative and aerobic genus of bacteria in the family Rhodobacteraceae with one known species, "Nitropelagi marinus". "Nitropelagi marinus" has been isolated from seawater from the Jebu Island in Korea.
