= Tangyun =

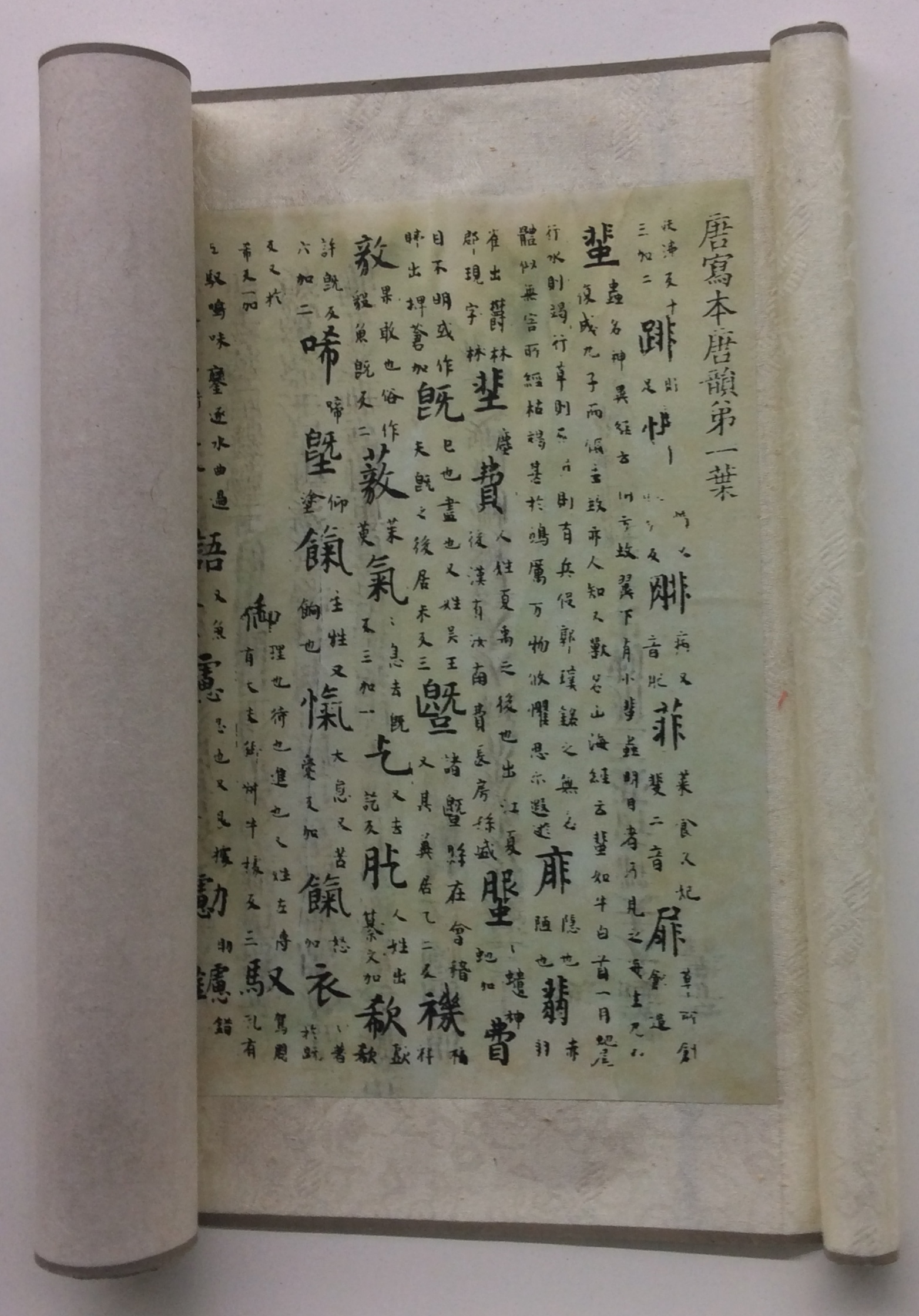
Tangyun excerpt in the Chinese Dictionary Museum, Jincheng, Shanxi

The Tangyun (simplified Chinese: 唐韵; traditional Chinese: 唐韻; pinyin: Tángyùn; lit. 'Tang rhymes') is a Chinese rime dictionary, published in 732 CE during the Tang dynasty, by Sun Mian (孫愐), which is a revised version of Qieyun, a guide for Chinese pronunciation by using the fanqie method. The original has lost. According to Shigutang Shuhua Huikao (式古堂書畫匯考) by Bian Yongyu (卞永譽), Tangyun has 5 volumes, 195 rimes totally. The statistics is the same as from Kanmiu Buque Qieyun (刊謬補缺切韻) by Wang Renxu (王仁昫), which has respectively one more rimes in Shangshen (上聲) and Qusheng (去聲) than Qieyun.

The Buddhist Uyghur Kingdom of Qocho used the Qianziwen (the Thousand Character Classic), Qieyun and it was written that "In Qocho city were more than fifty monasteries, all titles of which are granted by the emperors of the Tang dynasty, which keep many Buddhist texts such as the Tripitaka, Tangyun, Yupian, and Jingyin 經音."
