= Pakapoo =

Chinese lottery game

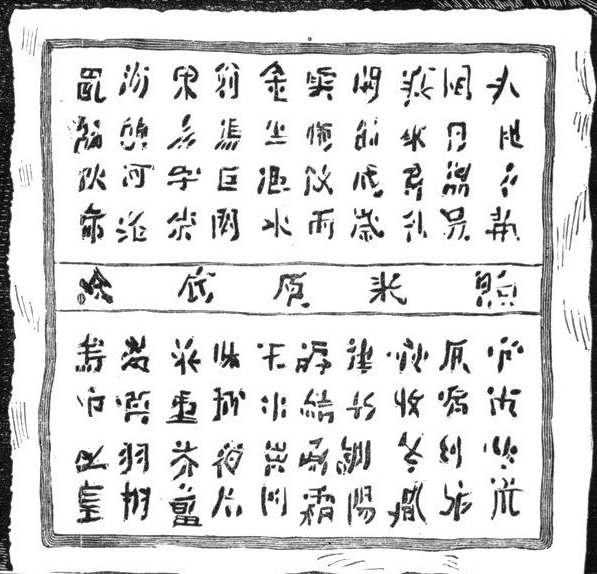
1876 Australian illustration of a pakapoo ticket

Pakapoo (simplified Chinese: 白鸽票; traditional Chinese: 白鴿票; sometimes spelt pak-ah-pu or Pák Kòp Piú) is a Chinese lottery game popular in Oceania in the 19th century, including on the Victorian Goldfields.

A pakapoo ticket is bought, which contains rows of characters from the Thousand Character Classic, an ancient poem in which no two words are repeated. The master ticket is kept hidden and is marked by the organiser of the game. The player marks a number of characters on their ticket. The ticket closest to the master ticket wins.

A 1921 article in The Argus in Melbourne, Australia, described the game in detail:

"Pukka-poo" is a gambling game imported from San Francisco, and is based upon an attempt to select 10 winning numbers out of 100 possibles. If the selector gets five right, the player gets his or her shilling back; if six are right, the winnings are £7; if 10, £42. Otherwise the Chinese wins! The draws are called "races," and take place every hour. In some of the places devoted to "pukka-poo," dice, crown and anchor, and other gambling games are played. The police do their best to break up these haunts of vice, but little can be done unless there is actual disorder. As a rule, when a customer has lost his money the Chinese give him 4d. and suggests the loser should go for a drink. That 4d. has stopped many a disturbance.

In Australian slang, "It looks like a Pakapoo ticket" is a reference to any writing that is messy or scrawled.
