= Jebudo =

Island in South Korea

- Interactive map of Jebudo

Geography
- Coordinates: 37°16′N 126°35′E
- Area: 0.98 km^{2} (0.38 sq mi)

Administration
- South Korea
- Province: Gyeonggi Province
- City: Hwaseong

Demographics
- Population: 668 (December 31, 2008)

Korean name
- Hangul: 제부도
- Hanja: 濟扶島
- RR: Jebudo
- MR: Chebudo

Jebudo (Korean: 제부도) is an island in Jebu-ri, Seosin-myeon, Hwaseong, Gyeonggi Province, South Korea. It is connected to the mainland by a road that is impassable twice a day due to high tide.

== Etymology ==
Historically, Jebudo was called "Jeobiseom" (저비섬) or "Jeopbiseom" (접이섬). Both of these terms mean "the island that can be seen from land".

The name "Jebu" possibly arose in the mid-Joseon period, from two characters of the phrase "Jeyakbugyeong" (제약부경; 濟弱扶傾; lit. 'carrying a child and assisting an old man walk over the mudflats'), used in the Thousand Character Classic.

== Description ==
The island has two mountains: Dangsan and Tapjaesan.

The relatively flat coastline contains many large mud flats. Foraging for seafood ingredients in the mudflats is a popular economic and tourist activity.

Jebudo Beach, on the south of the island, is a popular summer tourist destination. The main commercial street is near Jebudo Beach.
