= Qocho =

843–1353 Uyghur kingdom in modern Xinjiang, China

Qocho Kingdom 高昌回鶻
- 843–14th century
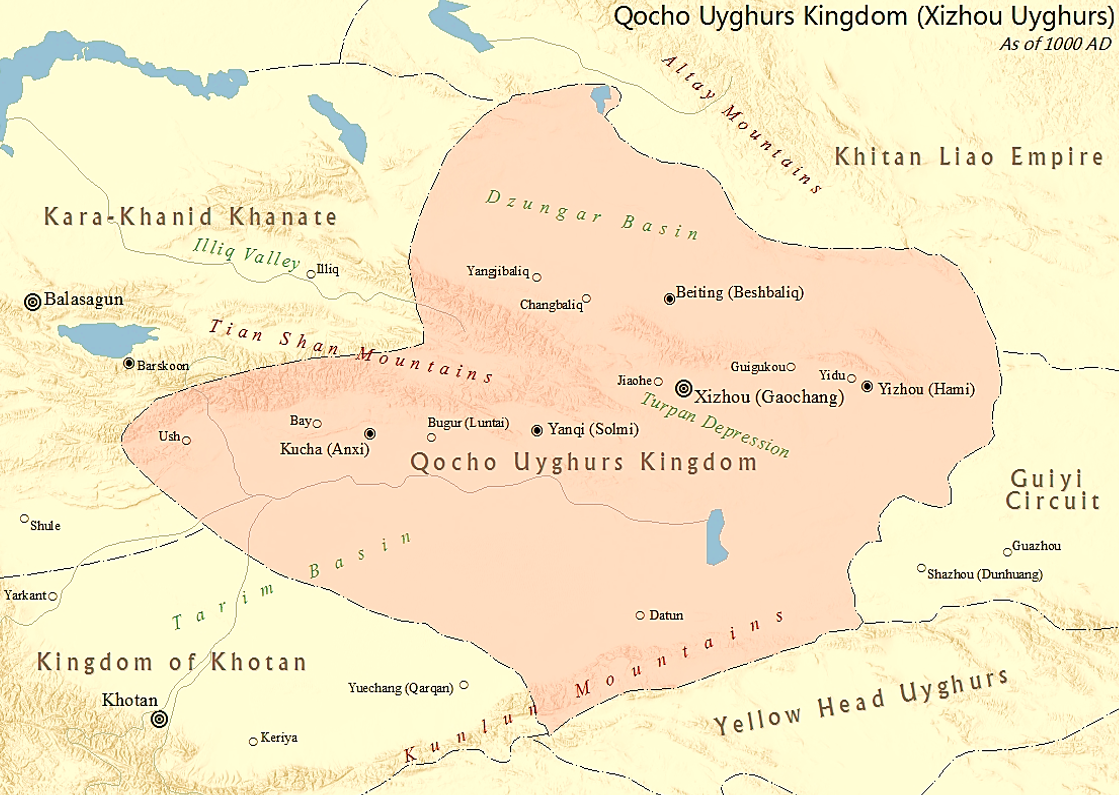
- Territory of Qocho c. 1000
- Status: Independent state (843–1132); Vassal state of the Western Liao (1132–1209); Vassal state of the Mongol Empire (1209–1335); Vassal state of the Chagatai Khanate (Late 13th to mid 14th century)
- Capital: Gaochang (Qocho), Beshbalik (Beiting/Tingzhou)
- Common languages: Old Uyghur, Middle Chinese; also Tocharian and Sogdian in early years
- Religion: Manichaeism (official initially 843–965), Buddhism (Later declared as official); Church of the East
- Government: Monarchy
- Idiqut
- History
  - Established: 843
  - Disestablished: 14th century
Preceded by	Succeeded by
Uyghur Khaganate; Tibetan Empire	Western Liao; Chagatai Khanate
- Today part of: China; Kazakhstan; Kyrgyzstan

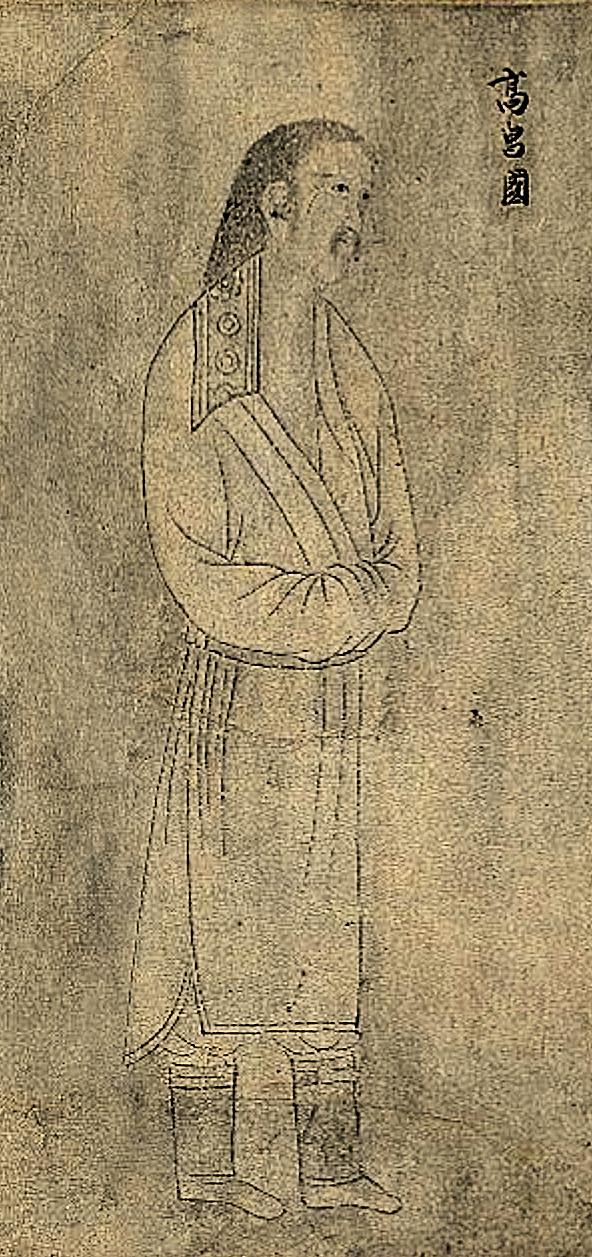
Man of Gaochang (高昌國, Turfan) in Entrance of the foreign visitors (番客入朝圖, 937–976 CE)

Qocho or Kara-Khoja (Chinese: 高昌回鶻; pinyin: Gāochāng Huíhú; lit. 'Gaochang Uyghurs'), also known as Idiqut ("holy wealth"; "glory"; "lord of fortune"), was a Uyghur kingdom created in 843, with strong Chinese Buddhist and Tocharian influences. It was founded by refugees fleeing the destruction of the Uyghur Khaganate after being driven out by the Yenisei Kirghiz. They made their winter capital in Qocho (also called Gaochang or Qara-Khoja, near modern Turpan) and summer capital in Beshbalik (modern Jimsar County, also known as Tingzhou). Its population is referred to as the "Xizhou Uyghurs" after the old Tang Chinese name for Gaochang, the "Qocho Uyghurs" after their capital, the "Kucha Uyghurs" after another city they controlled, or the "Arslan ("Lion") Uyghurs" after their king's title.

== History ==
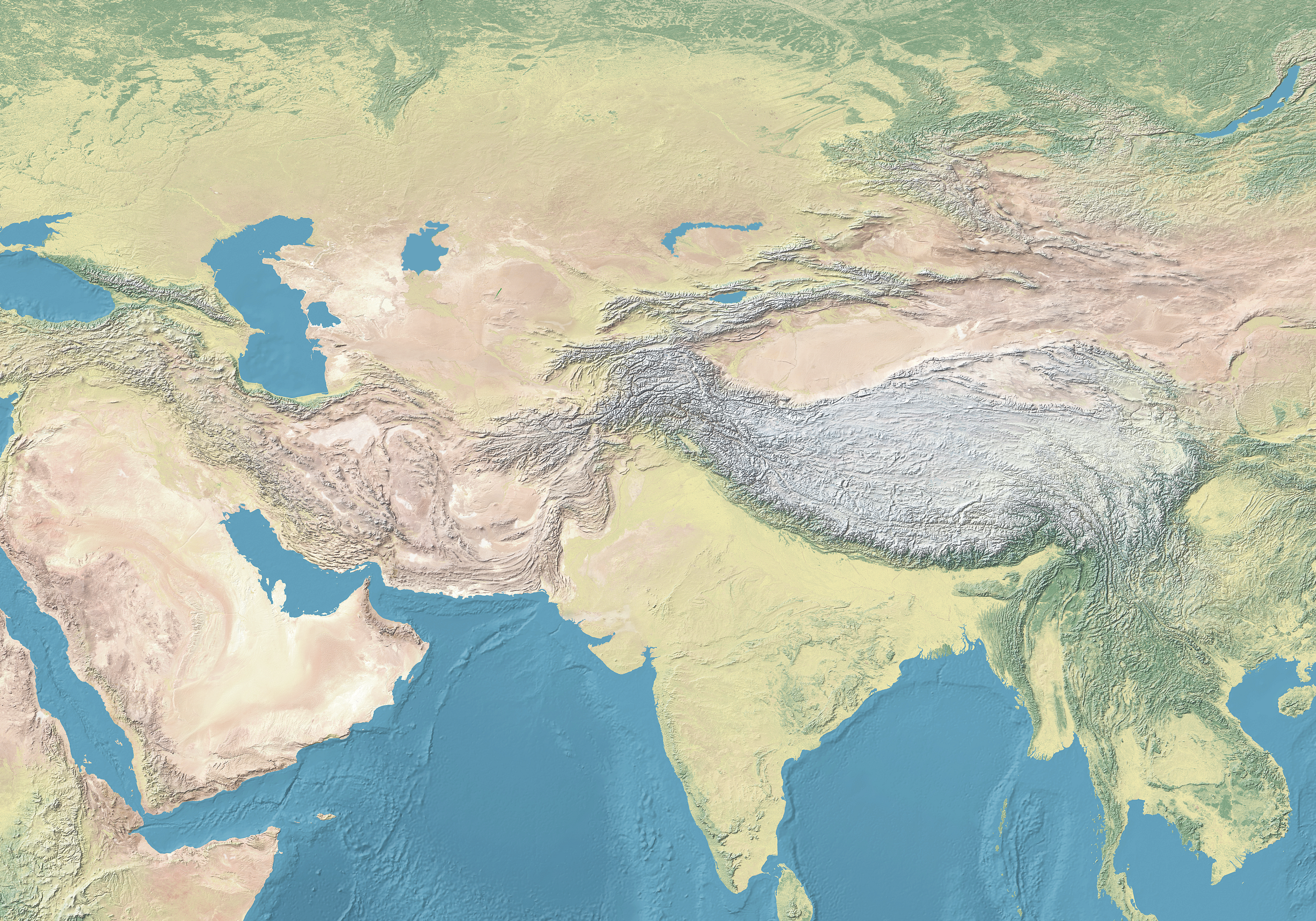
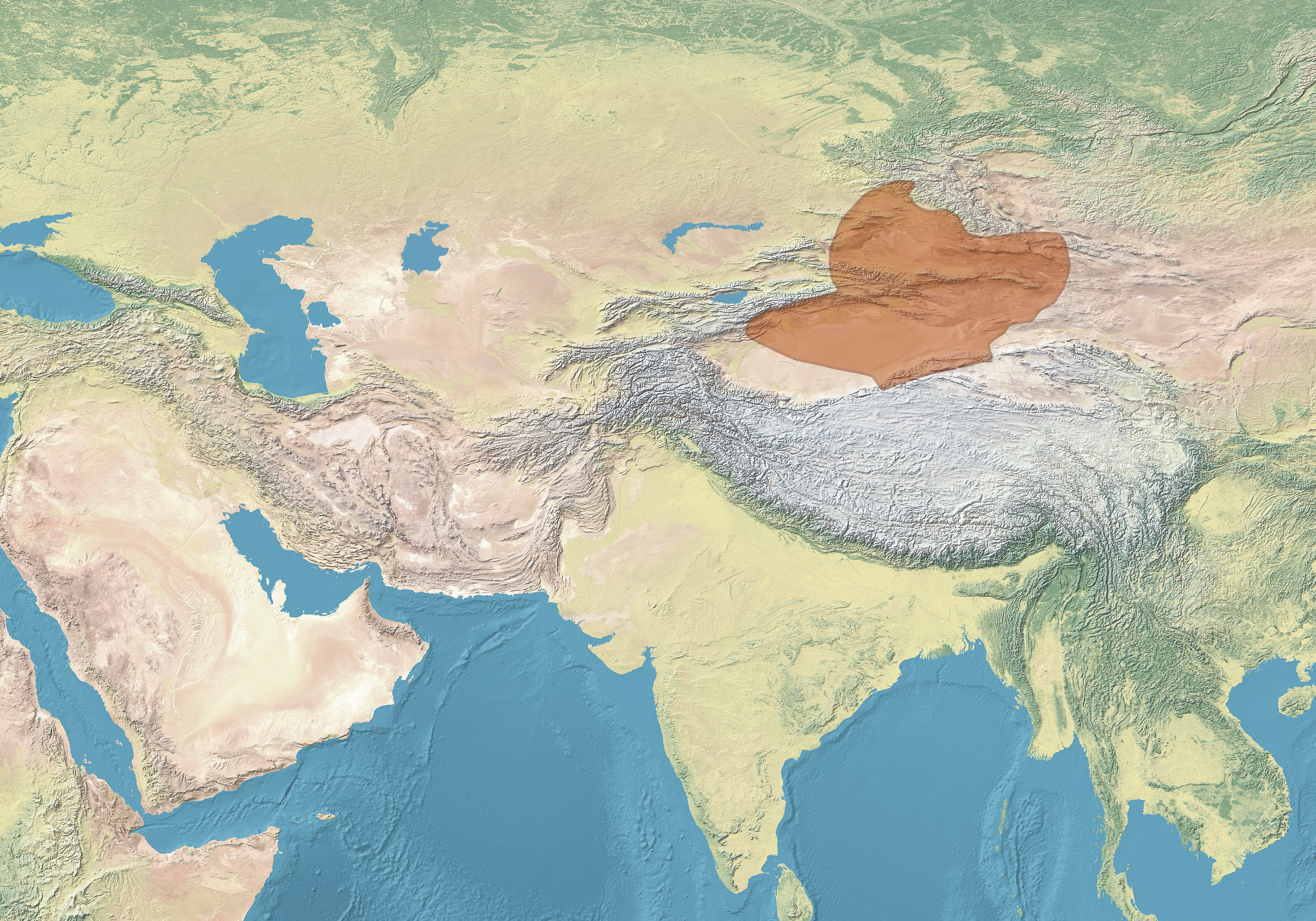
Qocho Kingdom and main neighbouring polities c. 1000

In 843, a group of Uyghurs migrated southward under the leadership of Pangtele, and occupied Karasahr and Kucha, taking them from the Tibetan Empire.

In 856, this group of Uyghurs received royal recognition from the Tang dynasty. At this time, their capital was in Karasahr (Yanqi).

The land of the Uighurs is very large, so large that to the west it appears boundless. In the fourth and fifth months, all vegetation dries up as if it were winter. The mountains are snow-covered even in summer. When the sun rises it becomes hot, but as soon as it sets, it grows cold. Even in the sixth lunar month (i.e., the peak of summer), people must use wadded coverlets to sleep. It does not rain in summer. The rain only starts to fall in autumn, and then the vegetation begins to sprout. Come winter, the rivers and plains are like our spring, with flowers in full bloom.

— Wugusun Zhongduan

In 866, Pugu Jun declared himself khan and adopted the title of idiqut. The Kingdom of Qocho captured Xizhou (Gaochang), Tingzhou (Beshbalik, or Beiting), Changbaliq (near Ürümqi) and Luntai (Bugur) from the Guiyi Circuit. The Uyghur capital was moved to Xizhou, which the Uyghurs called Idiqutshari. Beshbalik became their summer residence.

On the southern end of the Altai Mountains is a city of the Uighurs, called Bieshiba (Beshbaliq). There is a Tang-era stele there that identifies it as the former Vast Sea (Hanhai) Military Prefecture. The Vast Sea is several hundred li northwest of this city. In that sea is a small island covered with feathers shed by birds. Over two hundred li west of this city is the county of Luntai, which also has a Tang-era stele. Five hundred li south of this city (Beshbaliq) is Hezhou (Qocho), known as Gaochang in the Tang. It is also known as Yizhou. Three to four thousand li west of Gaochang is the city of Wuduan (Khotan), which was known as the kingdom of Yutian in the Tang. The two rivers that produce black and white jade are located there.

— Yelü Chucai

In 869 and 870, the Kingdom of Qocho attacked the Guiyi Circuit but was repelled. In 876, the Kingdom of Qocho seized Yizhou from the Guiyi Circuit. In 880, Qocho attacked Shazhou (Dunhuang) but was repelled. By 887, they were settled under an agrarian lifestyle in Qocho.

In 904, Zhang Chengfeng of the Guiyi Circuit (later renamed Jinshan Kingdom) attacked Qocho and seized Yizhou (Hami/Kumul) and Xizhou (Gaochang). This occupation ended after the Jinshan Kingdom's loss to the Ganzhou Uyghur Kingdom in 911. In 954, Ilig Bilgä Tengri rose to power. In 981, Arslan Bilgä Tengri ilig rose to power. From 981, the Idiqut of Qocho sent tribute missions to the Song dynasty under the title "Nephew Lion King Arslan Khan of the West Prefecture." The addition of the title "Nephew" (外甥) was intended as a show of sincerity to the Han people of the Central Plains, as "nephew" referred to the traditional relationship between the Uyghur Khans and the previous Tang dynasty, who referred to each other as uncle and nephew. Meanwhile, West Prefecture (西州) referred to Qocho's designation under Tang administration. In 984, Arslan Bilgä Tengri ilig became Süngülüg Khagan. In the same year, a Song Chinese envoy reached Qocho and gave an account of the city:

There is no rain or snow here and it is extremely hot. Each year at the hottest time, the inhabitants dig holes in the ground to live in ... The earth here produces all the five grains except buckwheat. The nobility eat horseflesh, while the rest eat mutton, wild ducks and geese. Their music is largely played on the pipa and harp. They produce sables, fine white cotton cloth, and an embroidered cloth made from flower stamens. By custom they enjoy horseback riding and archery ... They use the [Tang] calendar produced in the seventh year of the Kaiyuan reign (719). They fashion pipes of silver or brass and channel flowing water to shoot at each other; or they sprinkle water on each other as a game, which they call pressing out the sun's heat to chase off sickness. They like to take walks, and the strollers always carry a musical instrument with them. There are over fifty Buddhist temples here, the names inscribed over their gates all presented by the Tang court. The temples house copies of the Buddhist scriptures (da zang jing) and the dictionaries Tang yun, Yupian and Jingyun. On spring nights the locals pass the time milling about between the temples. There's an "Imperial Writings Tower' which houses edicts written by the Tang emperor Taizong kept carefully secured. There's also a Manichaean temple, with Persian monks who keep their own religious law and call the Buddhist scriptures the 'foreign Way' ... In this land there are no poor people; anyone short of food is given public aid. People live to an advanced age, generally over one hundred years. No one dies young.

In 996, Bügü Bilgä Tengri ilig succeeded Süngülüg Khagan.

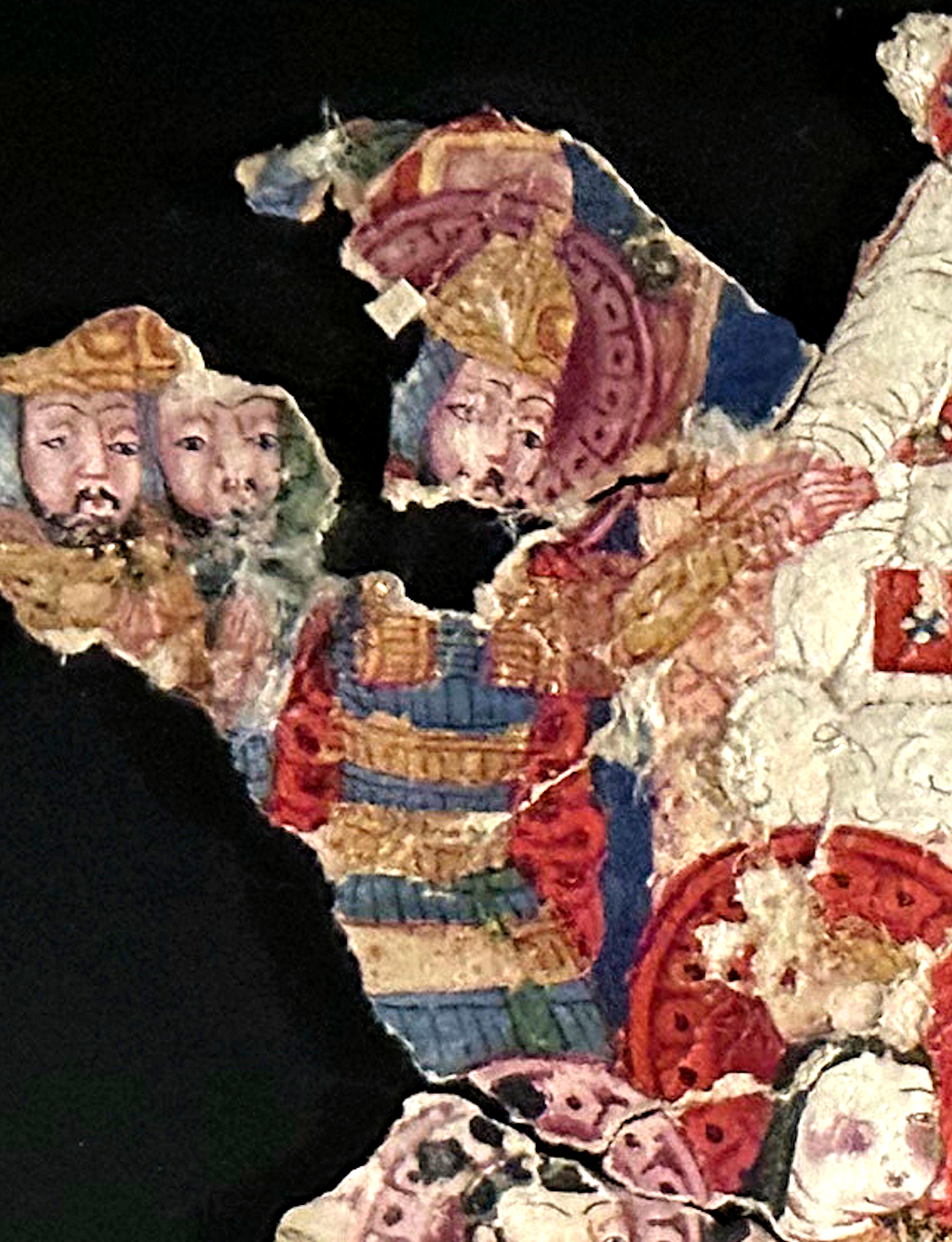
Bögü Qaghan, third khagan of the Uyghur Khaganate, converting to Manichaeism in 762. Detail of Bögü Qaghan in a suit of armour, kneeling to a Manichean high priest. Eighth-century Manichean manuscript (MIK III 4979).

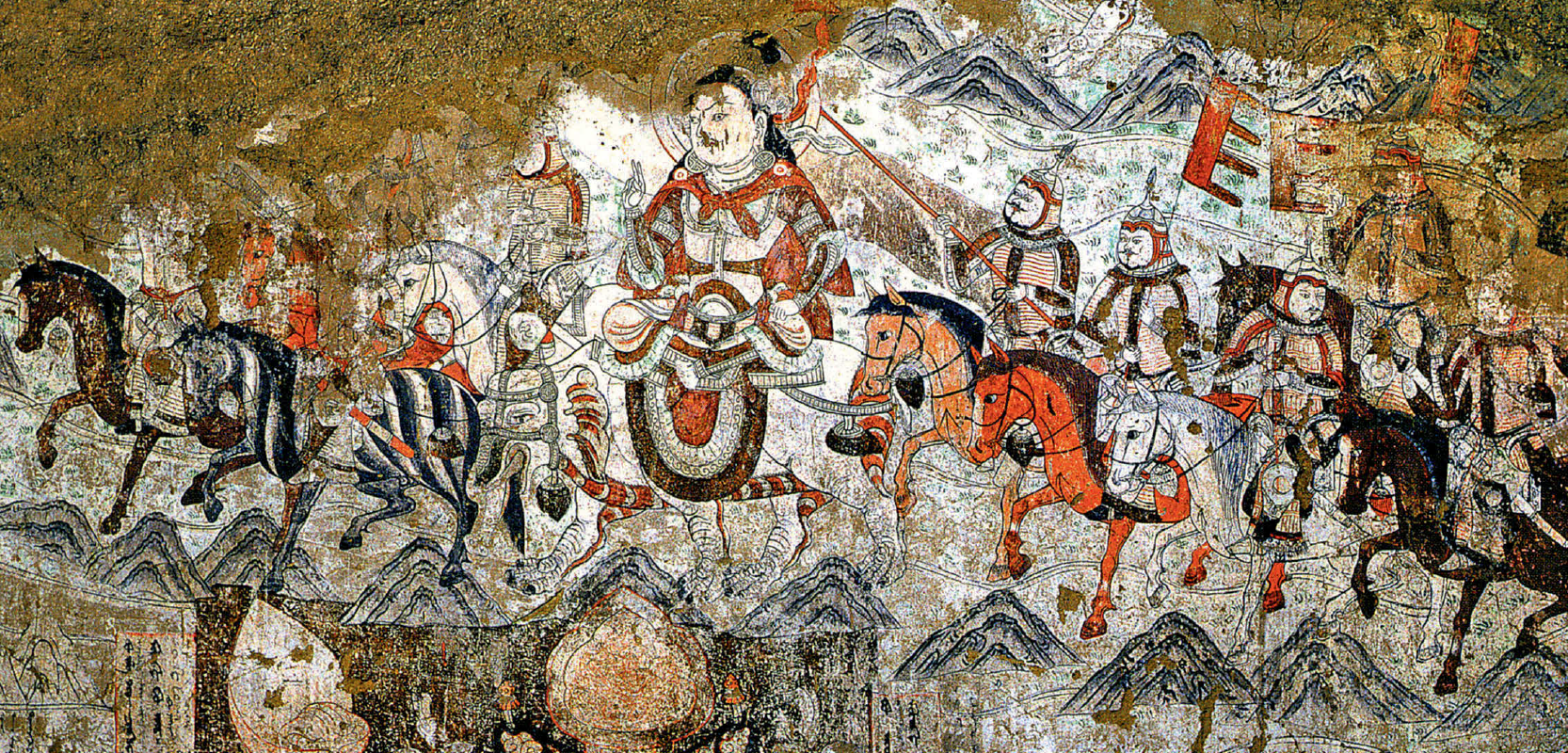
Mural of Turkic cavalry from Beshbalik, 10th c.

In 1007, Alp Arsla Qutlugh Kül Bilgä Tengri Khan succeeded Bügü Bilgä Tengri ilig. In 1008, Manichaean temples were converted to Buddhist temples. In 1024, Kül Bilgä Tengri Khan succeeded Alp Arsla Qutlugh Kül Bilgä Tengri Khan. In 1068, Tengri Bügü il Bilgä Arslan Tengri Uighur Tärkän succeeded Kül Bilgä Tengri Khan. By 1096, Qocho had lost Aksu, Tumshuk, and Kucha to the Kara-Khanid Khanate.

In 1123, Bilgä rose to power. He was succeeded by Yur Temur at some point. In 1128, the Kingdom of Qocho became a vassal of the Qara Khitai.

In 1128, during the reign of Bilge Tekin, the Uighur Kingdom became a vassal state of the Western Liao established by the Khitan. Originally the Western Liao exercised only a loose control over the Uighur state, but soon started to extort excessive taxes and levies in the Uighur lands. In 1209, the Uighur Iduq-qut ("Lord of happiness") Barchuk Art Tegin ordered the death of the Khitan magistrate (shangjian) in an attempt to free his people from the rule of the Western Liao. It just so happened that Chinggis Khan's envoys arrived at this juncture, and fearing retaliation from the Liao, he immediately sent envoys to Mongolia to express his willingness to acknowledge allegiance to Chinggis in exchange from protection.

— George Qingzhi Zhao

In 1209, the Kingdom of Qocho became a vassal of the Mongol Empire.

I must, however, point out that, although Chinggis Khan adopted the ruler of the Uighur state Barchukh Art Tegin as his "fifth son", the Uighur state never became the "fifth khanate", as has been suggested by some scholars. The Uighur state was not independent, but was part of the Mongol empire. During the early Yuan dynasty, at least before the Princes' rebellions, the Yuan central government exercised a tight control over the Uighur state. Although the Mongol royal family maintained a marriage relationship with the Uighur Idu-qut family for almost a century, the women who were married into Uighurstan were not the daughters of the Yuan emperors, but were mostly descendants of Ogedei Khan who had lost the throne to the descendants of Tolui, his younger brother. At the same time, although the Mongol royal family continued to marry their Princesses to the Uighur Iduqut, not a single one of the Mongol Khans or Yuan Emperors married a Uighur Princess.

— George Qingzhi Zhao

In 1229, Barčuq Art iduq-qut succeeded Yur Temur. In, 1242 Kesmez iduq-qut succeeded Barčuq Art iduq-qut. In 1246, Salïndï Tigin iduq-qut succeeded Kesmez iduq-qut. In 1253, Ögrünch Tigin iduq-qut succeeded Salïndï Tigin iduq-qut. In 1257, Mamuraq Tigin iduq-qut succeeded Ögrünch Tigin iduq-qut, who was executed for supporting the Ogodeid branch of the Genghisid family. In 1266, Qosqar Tigin iduq-qut succeeded Mamuraq Tigin iduq-qut. In 1280, Negüril Tigin iduq-qut succeeded Qosqar Tigin iduq-qut.

In 1318, Negüril Tigin iduq-qut died. Later, the Kingdom of Qocho became part of the Chagatai Khanate. In 1322, Tämir Buqa iduq-qut rose to power. In 1330, Senggi iduq-qut succeeded Tämir Buqa iduq-qut. In 1332, Taipindu iduq-qut succeeded Senggi iduq-qut. In 1352, Ching Timür iduq-qut succeeded Taipindu iduq-qut and was the last known ruler governor of the kingdom. By the 1370s, the Kingdom of Qocho ceased to exist.

== Religion ==
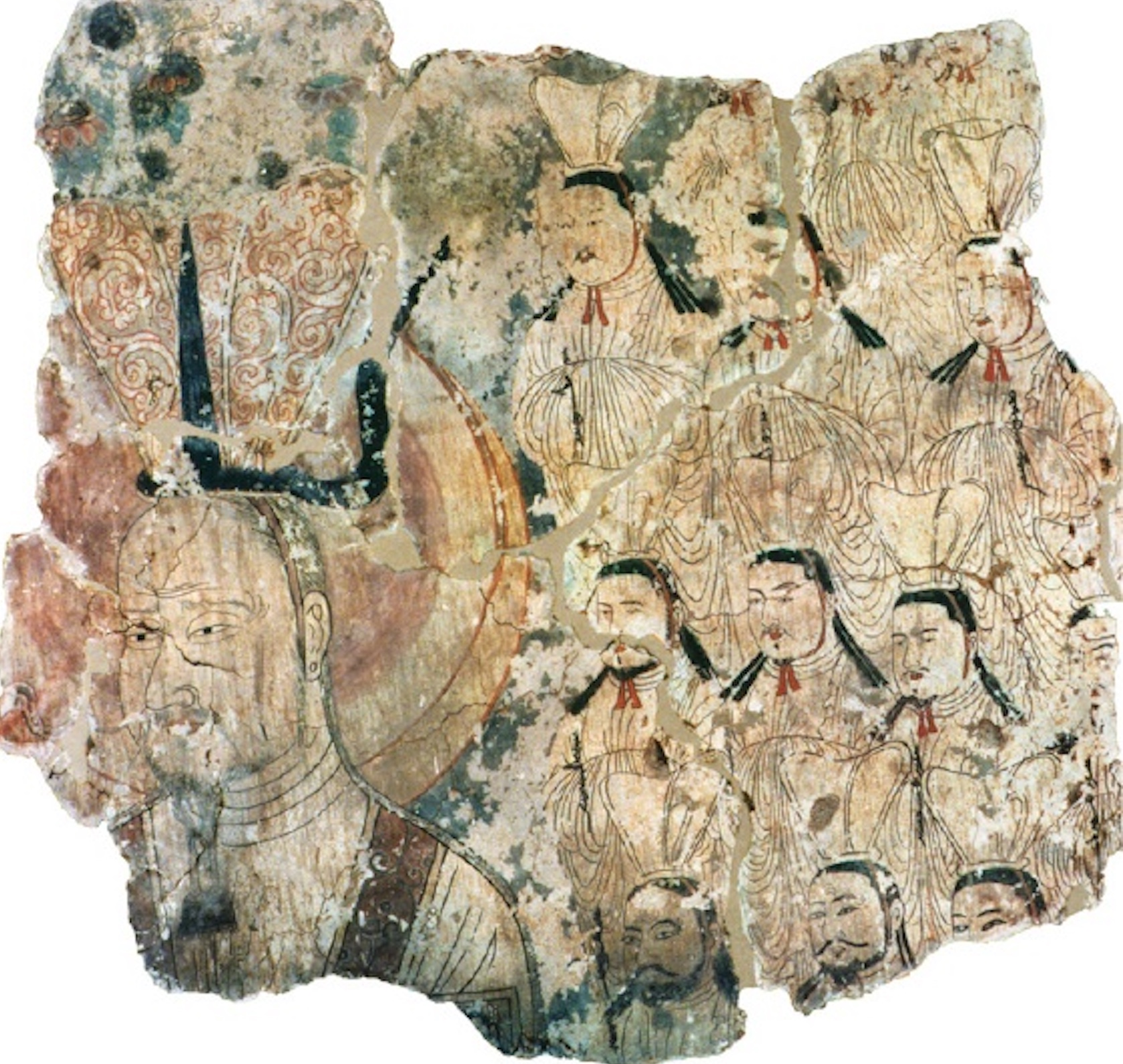
10th century Manichaean Electae in Gaochang (Khocho), China

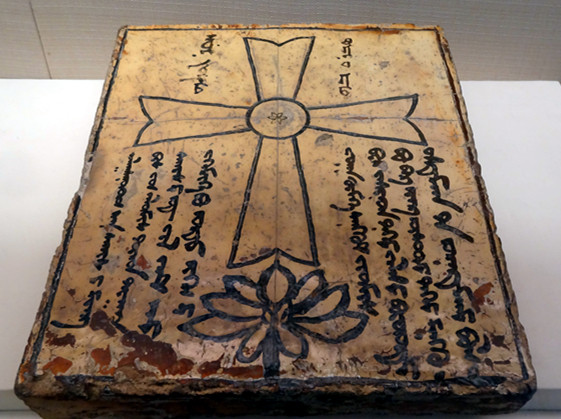
A Church of the East epitaph with two lines of Syriac at the top and four lines of Old Uyghur script on either side at the bottom

Mainly Turkic and Tocharian, but also Chinese and Iranian peoples such as the Sogdians were assimilated into the Uyghur Kingdom of Qocho. Chinese were among the population of Qocho. Peter B. Golden writes that the Uyghurs not only adopted the writing system and religious faiths of the Sogdians, such as Manichaeism, Buddhism, and Christianity, but also looked to the Sogdians as "mentors" while gradually replacing them in their roles as Silk Road traders and purveyors of culture.

During the rule of the Qocho Kingdom, some of their subjects also began adopting Islam, as evident when the Idiqut threatened to retaliate against the Muslims of his lands and "destroy the mosques" if Manichaeans were persecuted in neighbouring Khorasan. He emphasized that Muslims in Qocho were "more numerous" than Manichaeans under Islamic rule, and he was ultimately successful in staying the persecutions in Khorasan. This episode was recorded by Arab bibliographer Ibn Al-Nadim, although he referred to the Qocho Idiqut as the "King of China".

=== Manichaeism ===
The Uyghur ruling family of Qocho were mainly practitioners of Manichaeism until the early 11th century, although by the 960s, they also supported Buddhism. When Al-Muqtadir (r. 908–932) of the Abbasid Caliphate began persecuting Manichaeans in what is now Iraq, the ruler of Qocho sent a letter to Nasr II of the Samanid Empire threatening to retaliate against Muslims in his realm. Manichaean monks accompanied Uyghur embassies from 934 to 951, while between 965 and 1022, the accompanying monks were Buddhists. Manichaeism in Qocho probably reached its peak in 866 and was gradually replaced by Buddhism afterward. This shift was noticeable by 1008 when Manichaean temples were converted to Buddhist temples. Part of the reason for Manichaeism's decline may have been the lifestyle of the Manichaean clergy. A decree discovered in Turpan reports that Manichaean clerics lived in great comfort, possessed estates with serfs and slaves, ate fine food, and wore expensive garments. One of the most important medieval Uyghur documents is a 9th-century decree to a Manichaean monastery affixed with 11 seals in Chinese characters saying: "Seal of the cabinet minister and of the Il Ugasi ministers of the great, fortunate Uyghur government." The document details a dramatized dialogue between Mani and a prince, and testifies to the rich cultural life of the Qocho kingdom.

=== Chinese Buddhism ===
Tang rule over Qocho and Turfan left a lasting Chinese Buddhist influence on the area. Tang names remained on more than 50 Buddhist temples with Emperor Taizong of Tang's edicts stored in the "Imperial Writings Tower" and Chinese dictionaries like Jingyun, Yupian, Tang yun, and da zang jing (Buddhist scriptures) stored inside the Buddhist temples. Uyghur Buddhists studied the Chinese language and used Chinese books like the Thousand Character Classic and the Qieyun. It was written that "In Qocho city were more than fifty monasteries, all titles of which are granted by the emperors of the Tang dynasty, which keep many Buddhist texts as the Tripiṭaka, Tangyun, Yupuan, Jingyin etc."

The Uyghurs of Qocho continued to produce the Chinese Qieyun rime dictionary and developed their own pronunciations of Chinese characters. They viewed the Chinese script as "very prestigious" so when they developed the Old Uyghur alphabet, based on the Syriac script, they deliberately switched it to vertical like Chinese writing from its original horizontal position in Syriac.

While Persian monks still maintained a Manichaean temple in the kingdom, there was continued respect for Tang dynasty legacies and Buddhism. There were over fifty Buddhist temples, the name inscriptions on their gates all presented by the Tang court. The edicts of Emperor Taizong of Tang were carefully stored in an "Imperial Writings Tower." Indeed, the 10th century Persian geography book Hudud al-'Alam called Qocho, the capital city, "Chinese town".

== Ethnicity ==
James A. Millward claimed that the Uyghurs were generally "Mongoloid" (a term meaning "appearing ethnically Eastern or Inner Asian"), giving as an example the images of Uyghur patrons of Buddhism in Bezeklik, temple 9, until they began to mix with the Tarim Basin's original, Indo-European-speaking "Caucasoid" inhabitants, such as the so-called Tocharians. Buddhist Uyghurs created the Bezeklik murals.

== Religious conflict ==
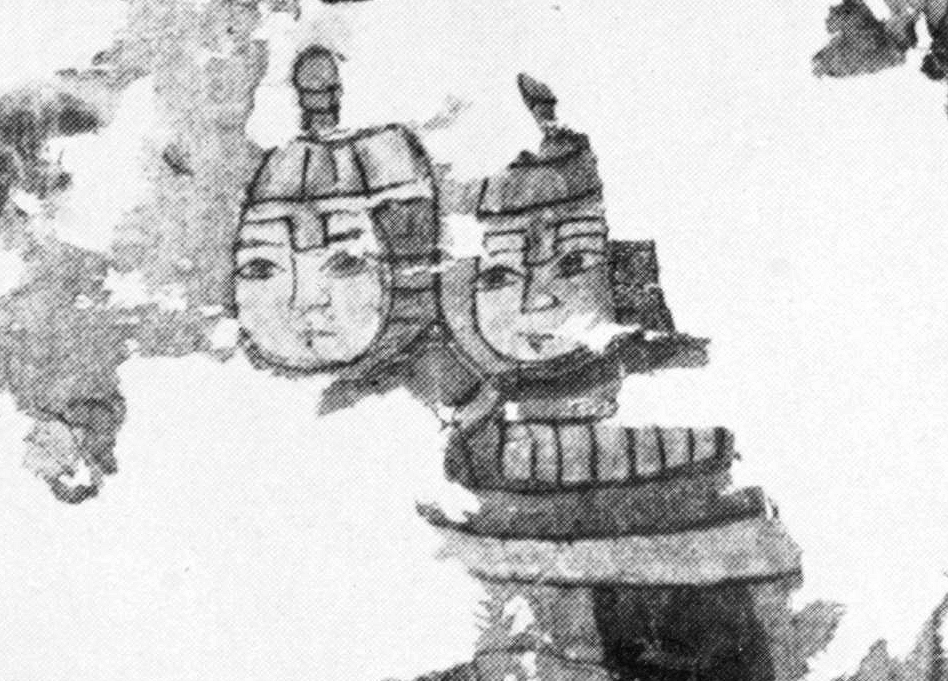
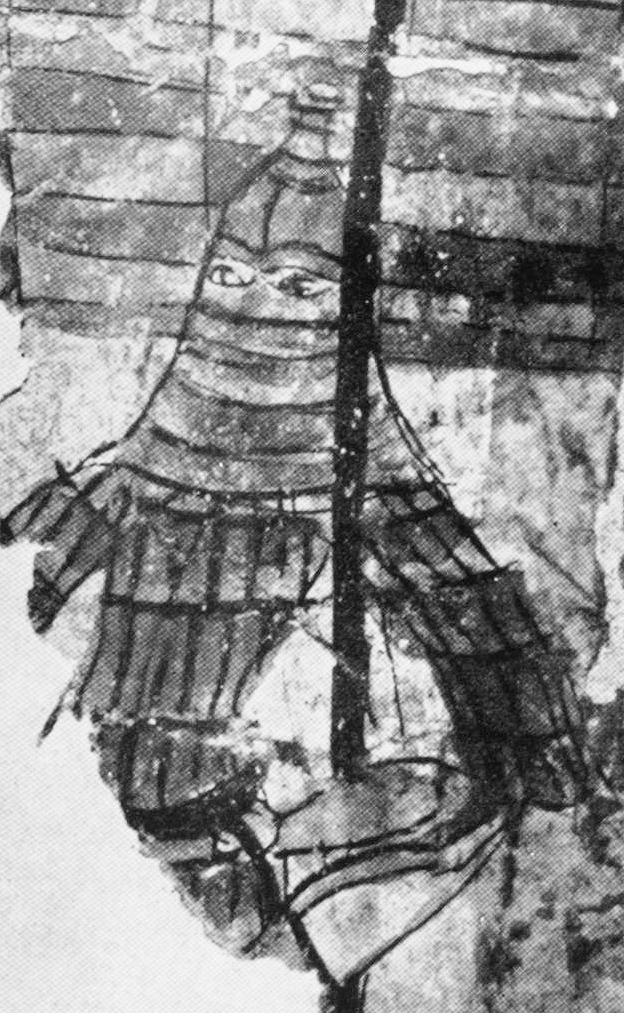
Painted silk fragments of men in armour, from a Manichaean Temple near Qocho. Turkish, 8th century or 9th century CE. Museum für Asiatische Kunst, Berlin.

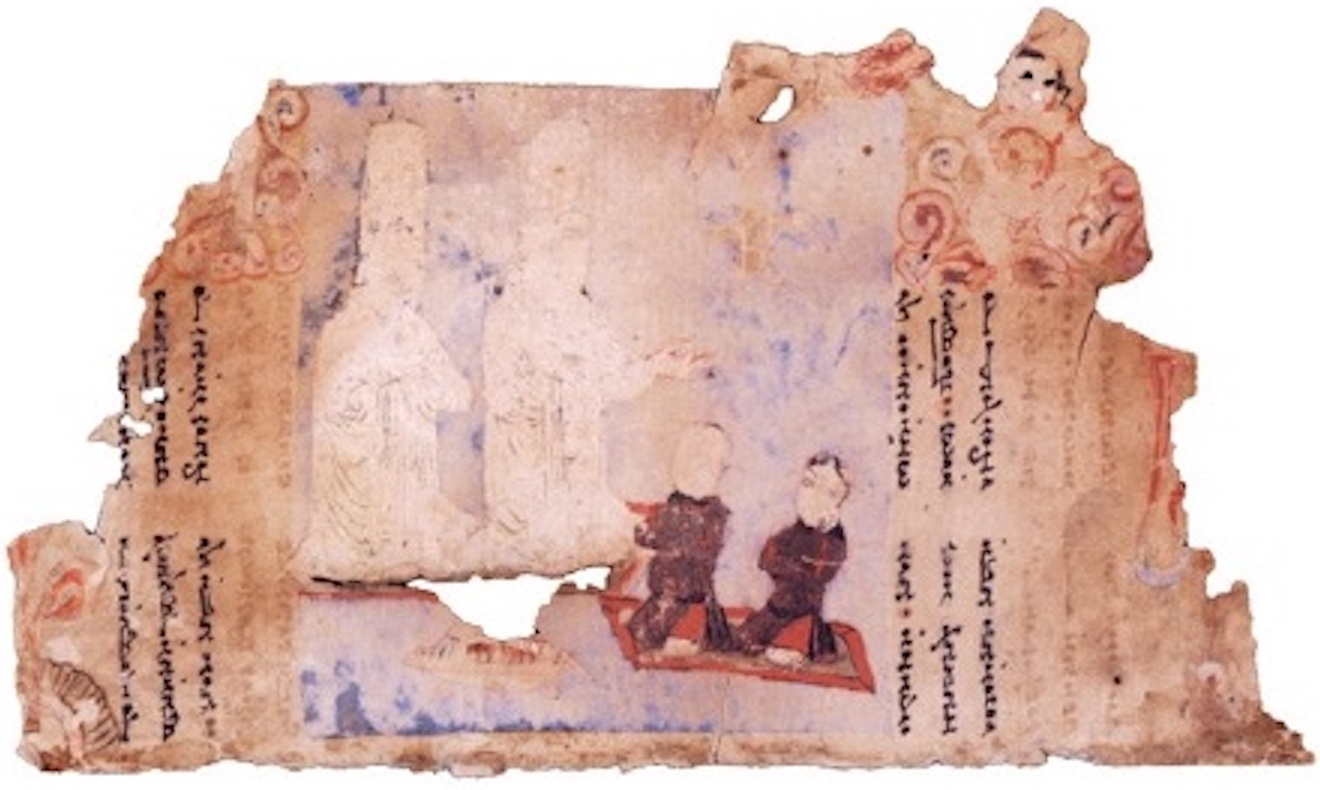
Leaf from Manichean book, mid-9th century

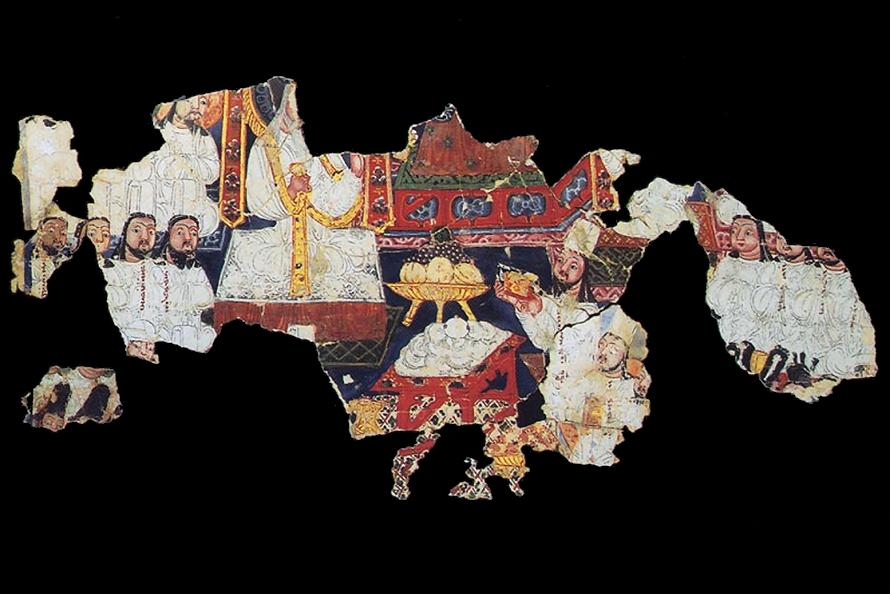
Manichean Bema Scene, 8th–9th centuries (Leaf from a Manichaean book MIK III 4979)

=== Kara-Khanid Khanate ===
The Uyghurs of Qocho were Buddhists whose religious identity were intertwined with their religion. Qocho was a Buddhist state with both state-sponsored Mahayana Buddhism and Manichaeism. The Uyghurs sponsored the construction of many of the temple-caves in what is now called the Bezeklik Caves. Although they retained some of their culture, they were heavily influenced by the indigenous peoples of western China and abandoned the Old Turkic alphabet in favor of a modified Sogdian alphabet, which later came to be known as the Old Uyghur alphabet. The Idiquts (the title of the Qocho rulers) ruled independently until they become a vassal state of the Qara Khitai (Chinese: "Western Liao").

They do not cremate their dead, but bury the dead without coffins. They always bury the dead with the head facing west. Their monks do not shave their heads, and there are no painted or sculpted images in their temples. The language of their scriptures is also unintelligible to us. Only in Hezhou (i.e., Gaochang/Qocho) and Shazhou (i.e., Dunhuang) are the temples and images like those of the Central Lands, and in those temples they recite Buddhist scriptures written in the Chinese (Han) script.

— Wugusun Zhongduan

The Buddhist Uyghurs frequently came into conflict with their western Muslim neighbors. Muslim Turks described the Uyghurs in a number of derogatory ways. For example, the "Compendium of the Turkic Dialects" by Mahmud al-Kashgari states that "just as the thorn should be cut at its root, so the Uighur should be struck on the eye". They also used the derogatory word "Tat" to describe the Buddhist Uyghurs, which means "infidels". Uyghurs were also called dogs. While al-Kashgari displayed a different attitude towards the Turk diviners beliefs and "national customs", he expressed towards Buddhism a hatred in his Diwan where he wrote the verse cycle on the war against Uyghur Buddhists. Buddhist origin words like toyin (a cleric or priest) and Burxān or Furxan (meaning Buddha, acquiring the generic meaning of "idol" in the Turkic language of Kashgari) had negative connotations to Muslim Turks.

The Uyghurs were subjected to attacks by Muslim Turks, according to Kashgari's work. The Kara-Khanid Khanate's ruler Sultan Satuq Bughra Khan razed Qocho's Buddhist temples in the Minglaq province across the Ili region. Buddhist murals at the Bezeklik Thousand Buddha Caves were damaged by local Muslim population whose religion proscribed figurative images of sentient beings, the eyes and mouths in particular were often gouged out. Pieces of murals were also broken off for use as fertilizer by the locals. The Islamic–Buddhist conflict from the 11th to 12th centuries is still recalled in the forms of the Khotan Imam Asim Sufi shrine celebration and other Sufi holy site celebrations. Bezeklik's Thousand Buddha Caves are an example of religiously motivated vandalism against portraits of religious and human figures.

According to Kashgari's Three Turkic Verse Cycles, the "infidel tribes" suffered three defeats, one at the hands of the Karakhanids in the Irtysh Valley, one by unspecified Muslim Turks, and one inflicted upon "a city between the Tangut and China", Qatun Sini, at the hands of the Tangut Khan. The war against Buddhist, shamanist, and Manichaean Uyghurs was considered a jihad by the Kara-Khanids. Imams and soldiers who died in the battles against the Uyghur Buddhists and Khotan are revered as saints. It is possible the Muslims drove some Uyghur Buddhist monks towards taking asylum in the Tangut Western Xia dynasty.

There are many varieties of people in that country. Their hair and beards are thick and curly like wool, and vary widely in shade from black to yellow. One sees only the eyes and noses on their faces [because of all the facial hair]. Their tastes and habits are also different from ours. There are Mosuluman (Muslim) Uighurs who are cruel by nature and eat only meat from animals that they have just killed with their own hands. Even when fasting, they drink wine and eat without any sense of unease. There are Yilizhu (Christian) Uighurs who are quite weak and cowardly and dislike killing; when fasting, they do not eat meat. There are Yindu (Indian) Uighurs who have black skin and are simple and honest. There are too many other kinds for me to list them all. Their king selects his eunuchs from those of the Yindu (Indians) who are dark and ugly and uses fire to brand their faces.

— Wugusun Zhongduan

=== Mongol rule ===
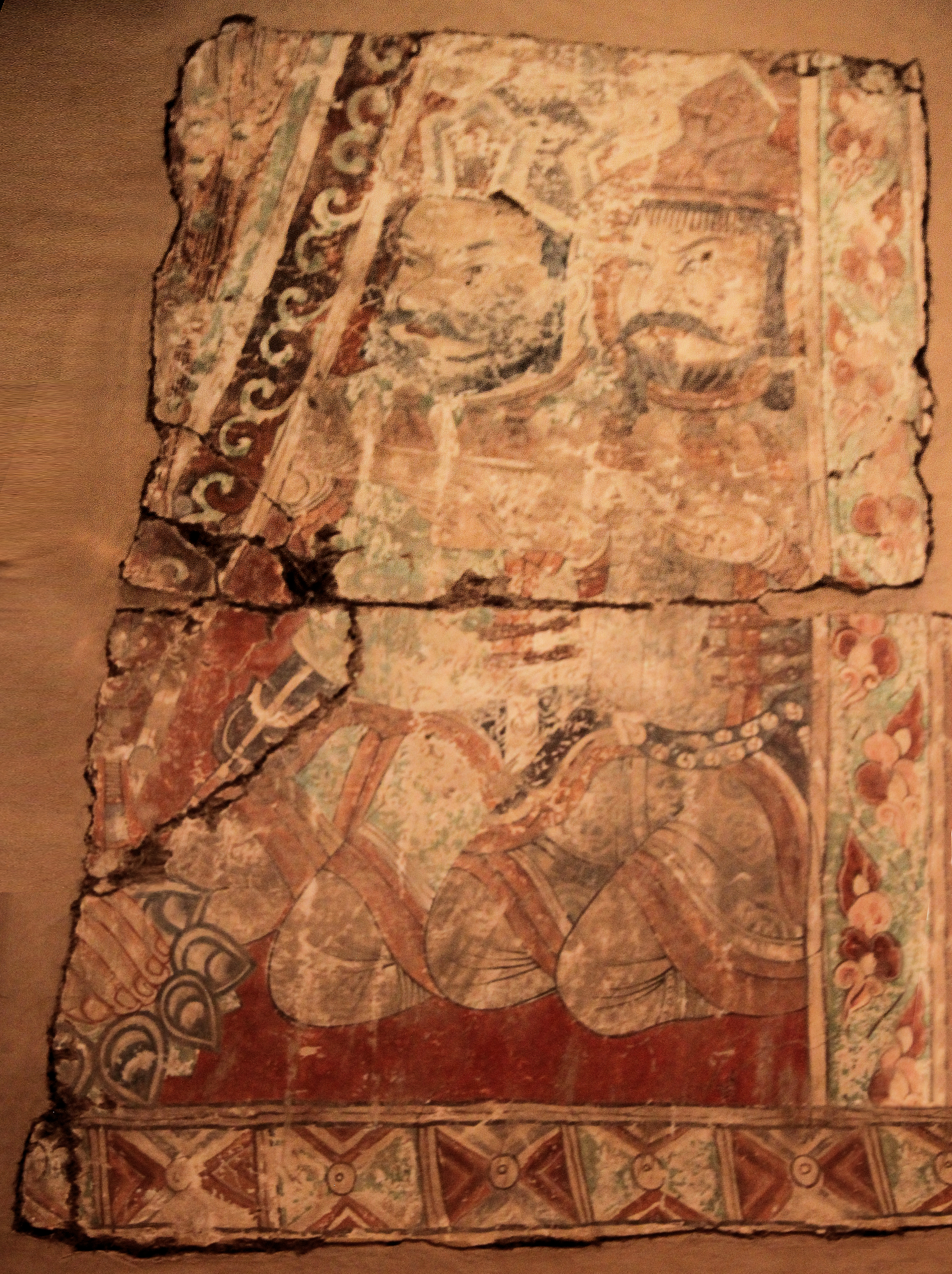
Pranidhi scene, Turpan, 10th–12th centuries

In 1209, the Kara-Khoja ruler Baurchuk Art Tekin declared his allegiance to the Mongols under Genghis Khan and the kingdom existed as a vassal state until 1335. After submitting to the Mongols, the Uyghurs served the Mongol rulers as bureaucrats, providing the expertise that the initially illiterate nomads lacked. Qocho continued exist as a vassal to the Mongols of the Yuan dynasty, and were allied to the Yuan against the Chagatai Khanate. Eventually the Chagatai khan Ghiyas-ud-din Baraq eliminated Yuan influence over Qocho. When the Mongols placed the Uyghurs in control of the Koreans at court, the Korean king objected. Emperor Kublai Khan rebuked the Korean king, saying that the Uyghur king ranked higher than the Karluk Kara-Khanid ruler, who in turn was ranked higher than the Korean King, who was ranked last, because the Uyghurs surrendered to the Mongols first, the Karluks surrendered after the Uyghurs, and the Koreans surrendered last, and that the Uyghurs surrendered peacefully without violently resisting. A hybrid court was used when Han Chinese and Uyghurs were in involved in legal issues.

Alans were recruited into the Mongol forces with one unit called the Asud or "Right Alan Guard", which was combined with "recently surrendered" soldiers, Mongols, and Chinese soldiers stationed in the area of the former kingdom of Qocho. In Beshbalik (now Jimsar County), the Mongols established a Chinese military colony led by Chinese general Qi Kongzhi.

=== Conquest by Muslim Chagatais ===
The last Buddhist Uyghurs of Qocho and Turpan were converted to Islam by force during a Jihad (holy war) at the hands of the Chagatai Khanate ruler Khizr Khoja (r. 1389–1399). Mirza Haidar Dughlat's Tarikh-i-Rashidi (c. 1540, in Persian) wrote, "(Khizr Khoja) undertook a campaign against Karakhodja [Qocho] and Turfan, two very important towns in China, and forced their inhabitants to become Muslims". The Chagatai Khanate also conquered Hami, where the Buddhist religion was also purged and replaced with Islam. Ironically after being converted to Islam, the descendants of the Uyghurs in Turpan failed to retain memory of their Buddhist legacy and were led to believe that the "infidel Kalmuks" (Dzungar people) were the ones who built Buddhist monuments in their area. The Encyclopaedia of Islam wrote "By then the Turks of the Turfan ... forgetting all the other highlights of their past, they attributed the Buddhist and other monuments to the 'infidel Kalmuks'."

The Islamic conversion forced on the Buddhist city of Hami was the final blow to Uyghur Buddhism, although some Buddhist influence in the names of Turpan Muslims still remained. Since Islam reached them much after other cities in the Tarim Basin, personal names of pre-Islamic Old Uyghur origin are still used in Hami and Turpan while Uyghurs to the west use mostly Islamic names of Arabic origin. Cherrypicking of history of Xinjiang with the intention of projecting an image of either irreligiosity or piousness of Islam in Uyghur culture has been done for various reasons.

After the conversion to Islam by Uyghurs, the term "Uyghur" fell out of use until it was revived in 1921.

== List of kings (idiquts) ==
The Kingdom of Qocho's rulers trace their lineage to Qutlugh of the Ediz dynasty of the Uyghur Khaganate. There are numerous gaps in our knowledge of the Uyghur rulers of Qocho prior to the thirteenth century. The title of the ruler of Qocho was idiqut or iduq qut. In 1308, Nolen Tekin was granted the title Prince of Gaochang by the Yuan Emperor Ayurbarwada. The following list of rulers is drawn mostly from Turghun Almas, Uyghurlar (Almaty, 1992), vol. 1, pp. 180–85. Named rulers based on various sources of other languages are also included.

- 843–866: Pan Tekin (Pangtele)
- 866–871: Boko Tekin (Pugu Jun)
  ...
- 940–948: Irdimin Khan
- 948–985: Arslan (Zhihai) Khan
  ...
- 954: Ilig Bilgä T[e]ngri
- 981: Arslan Bilgä T[e]ngri ilig
- 996–1007: Bügü Bilgä T[e]ngri ilig
- 1007–1024: Alp Arsla Qutlugh Kül Bilgä T[e]ngri Qan
- 1024: Kül Bilgä T[e]ngri Qan
- 1068: T[e]ngri Bügü il Bilgä Arslan Tngri Uighur Tärkän
- 1123: Bilgä
- 1126–????: Bilge (Biliege/Bilgä) Tekin
  ...
- ????–????: Isen Tomur
  ...
- 1208/1229–1235/1241: Baurchuq (Barchukh) Art Tekin
- 1229: Yue-er Tie-mu-er
- 1235/1242–1245/1246: Qusmayin (Kesmez)
- 1246–1253/1255: Salun (Salindi) Tekin
- 1253/1255–1257/1265: Oghrunzh (Ogrunch) Tekin
- 1257/1265–1265/1266: Mamuraq Tekin
- 1266–1276/1280: Qozhighar (Qosqar) Tekin
- 1276/1280–1318: Nolen (Neguril) Tekin
- 1309/1318: Kiräsiz iduq-qut
- 1309/1318-1326/1334: Köncök iduq-qut
- 1318/1322–1327/1330: Tomur (Tamir) Buqa
- 1327/1330–1331/1332: Sunggi (Senggi) Tekin
- 1331/1332–1335/1352: Taypan (Taipingnu)
- 1335–1353: Yuelutiemur
- 1352–1360: Ching Timür iduq-qut
- 1353–????: Sangge

== Image gallery ==
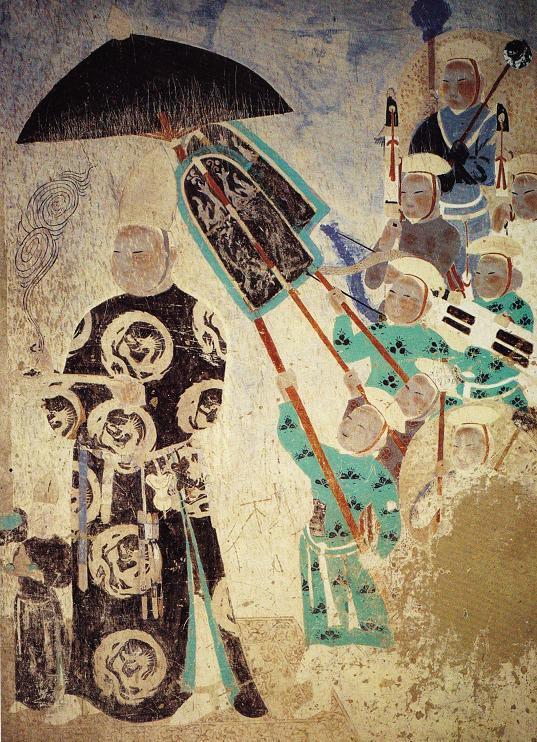
Uyghur king from Turfan

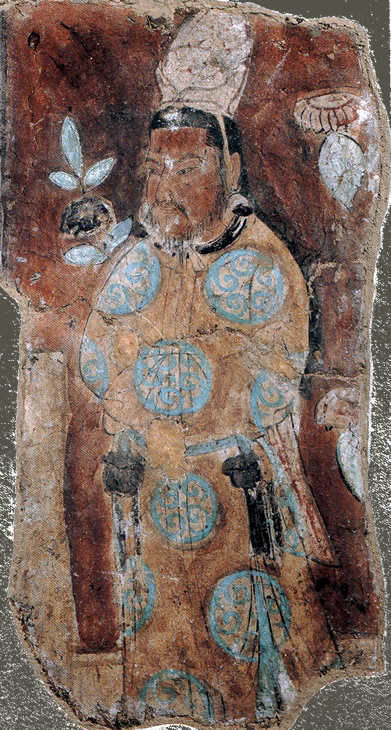
Uyghur Prince from the Bezeklik murals

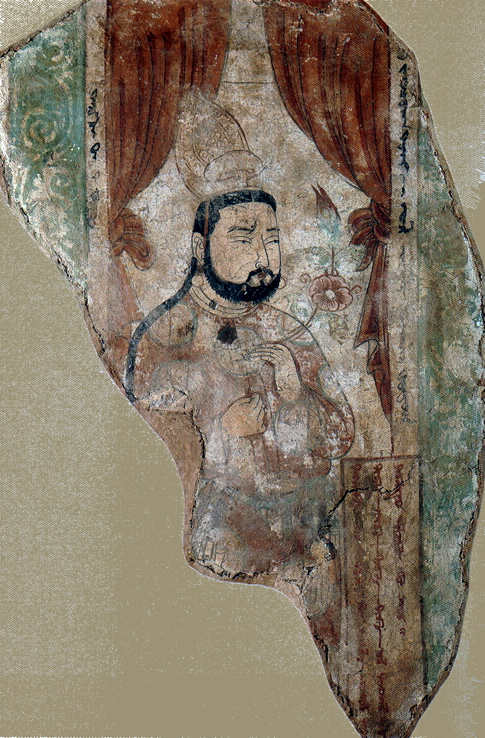
Uyghur noble from the Bezeklik murals

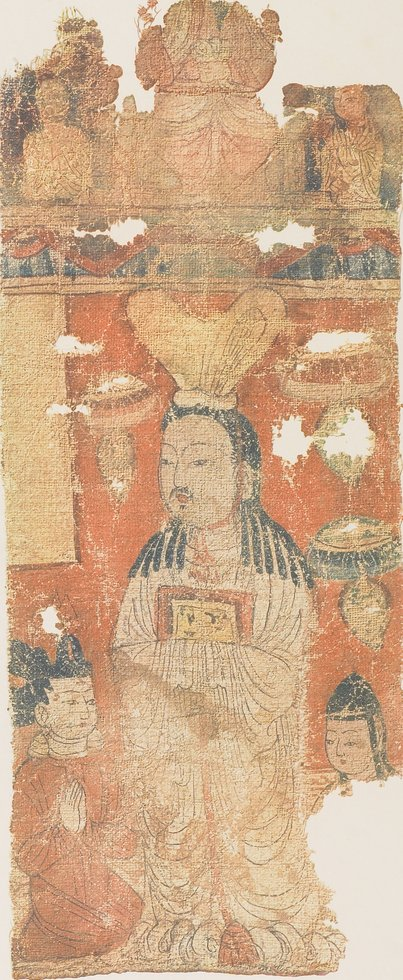
Uyghur Manichaean Elect depicted on a temple banner from Qocho

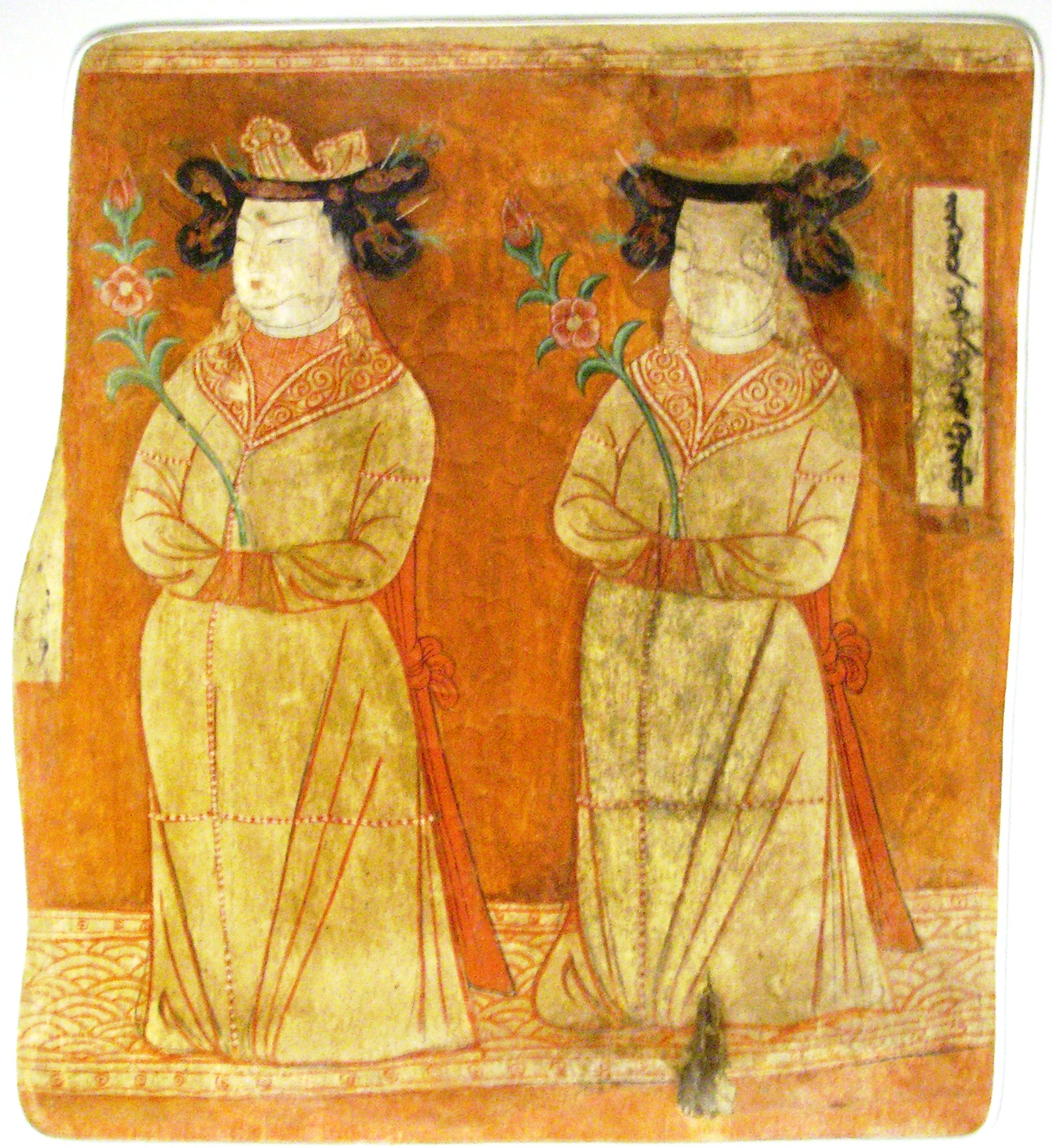
Uyghur Princesses from the Bezeklik murals

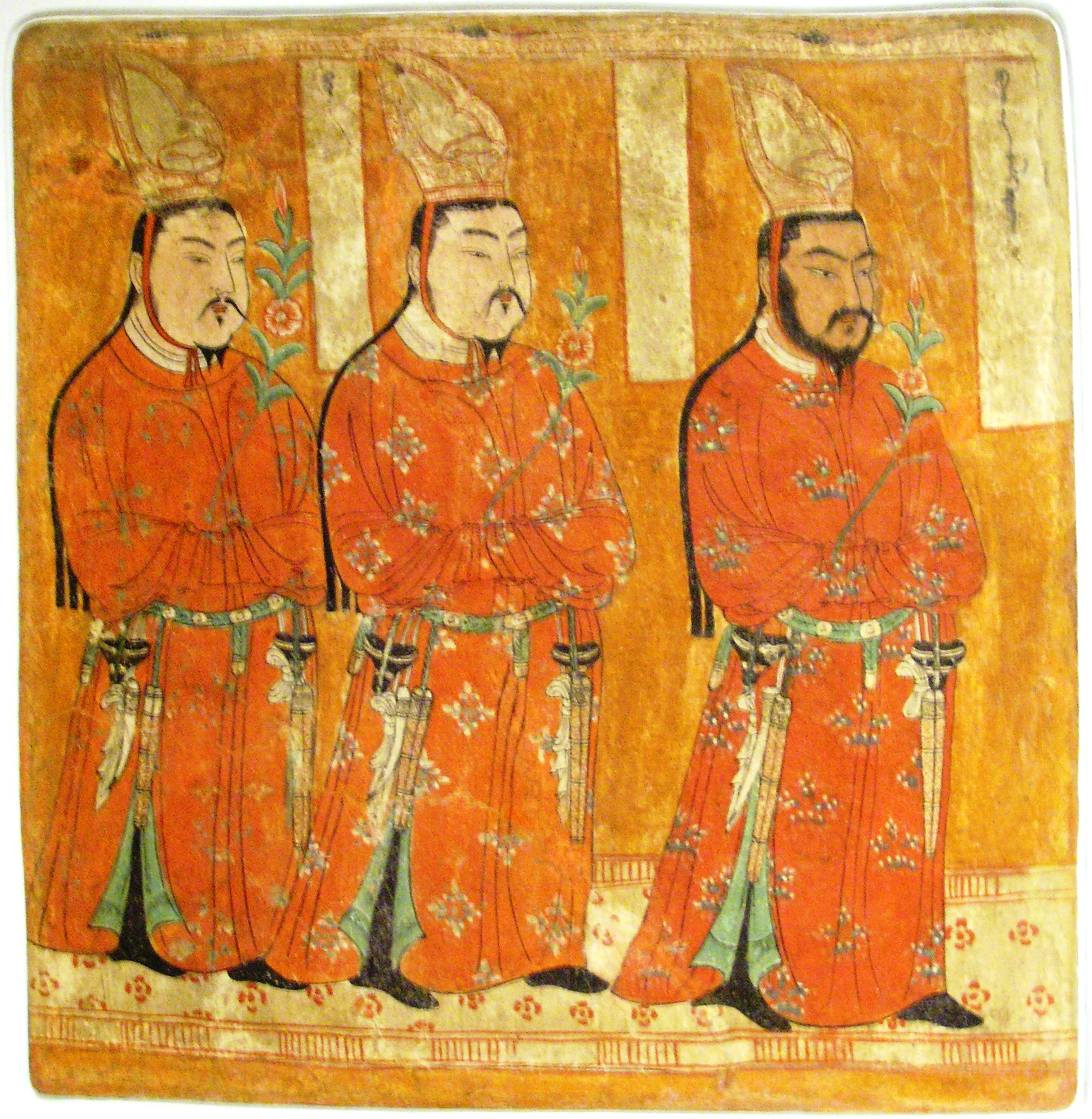
Uyghur Princes from the Bezeklik murals

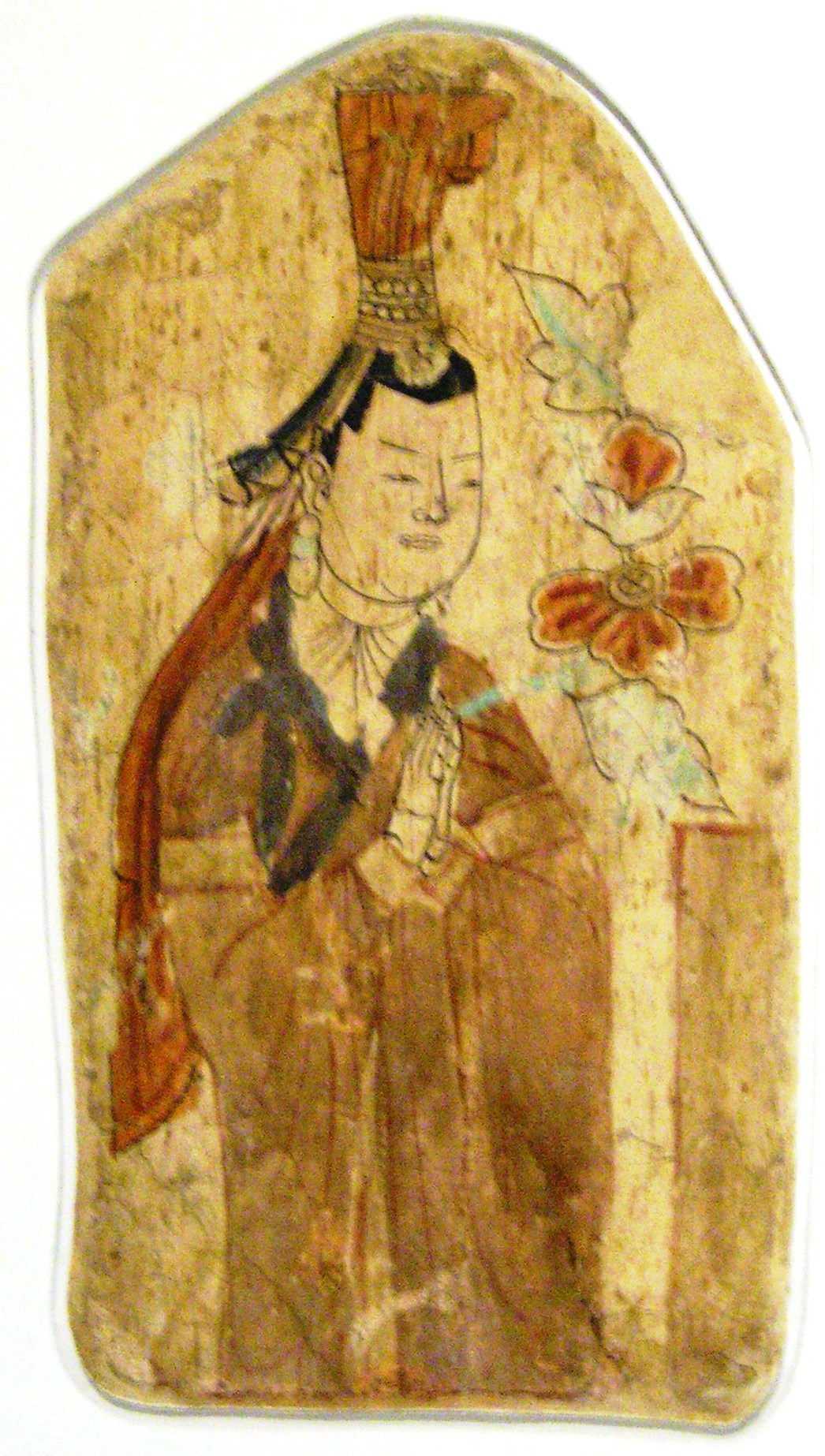
Uyghur donor from the Bezeklik murals

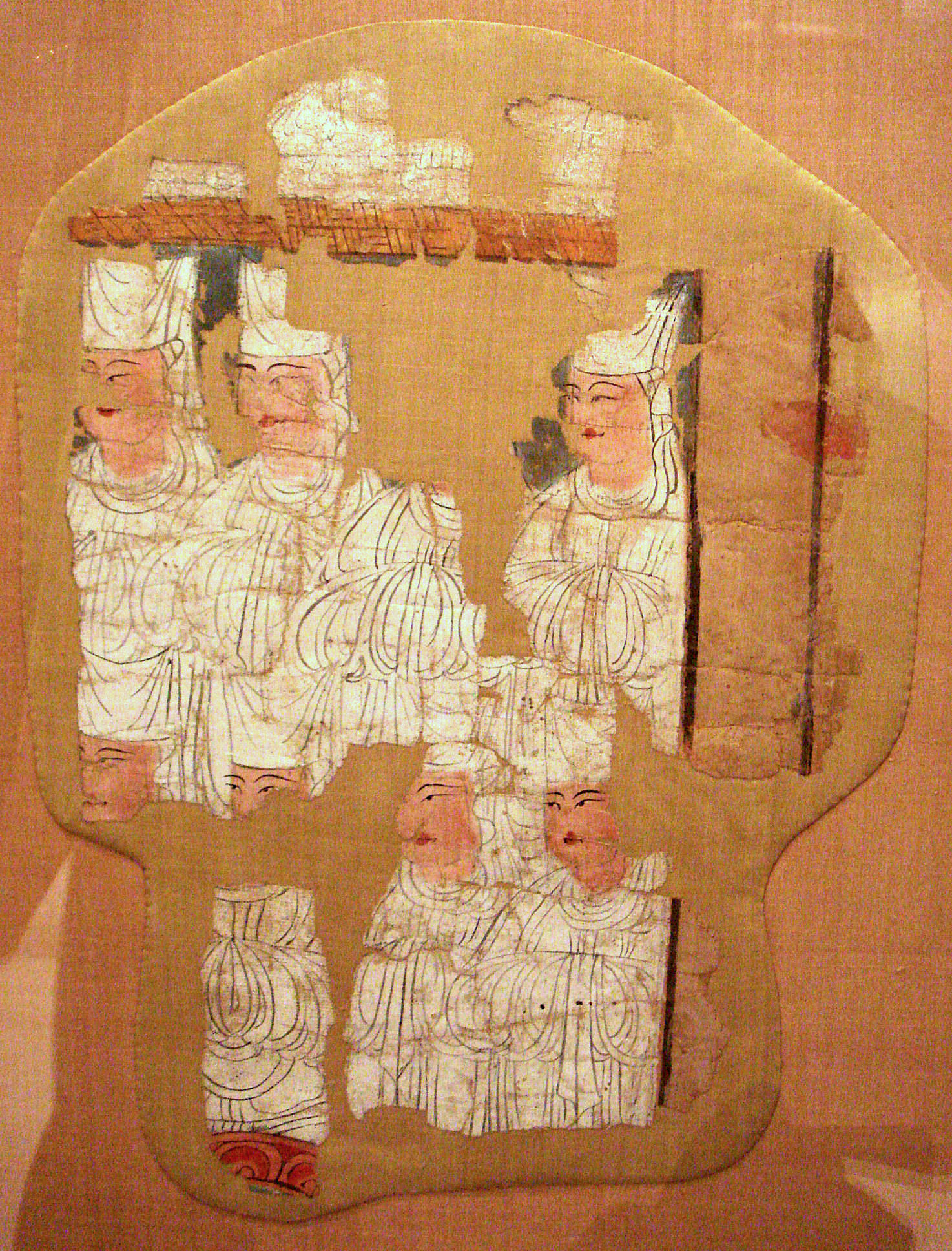
Uyghur Manichaean Electae from Qocho

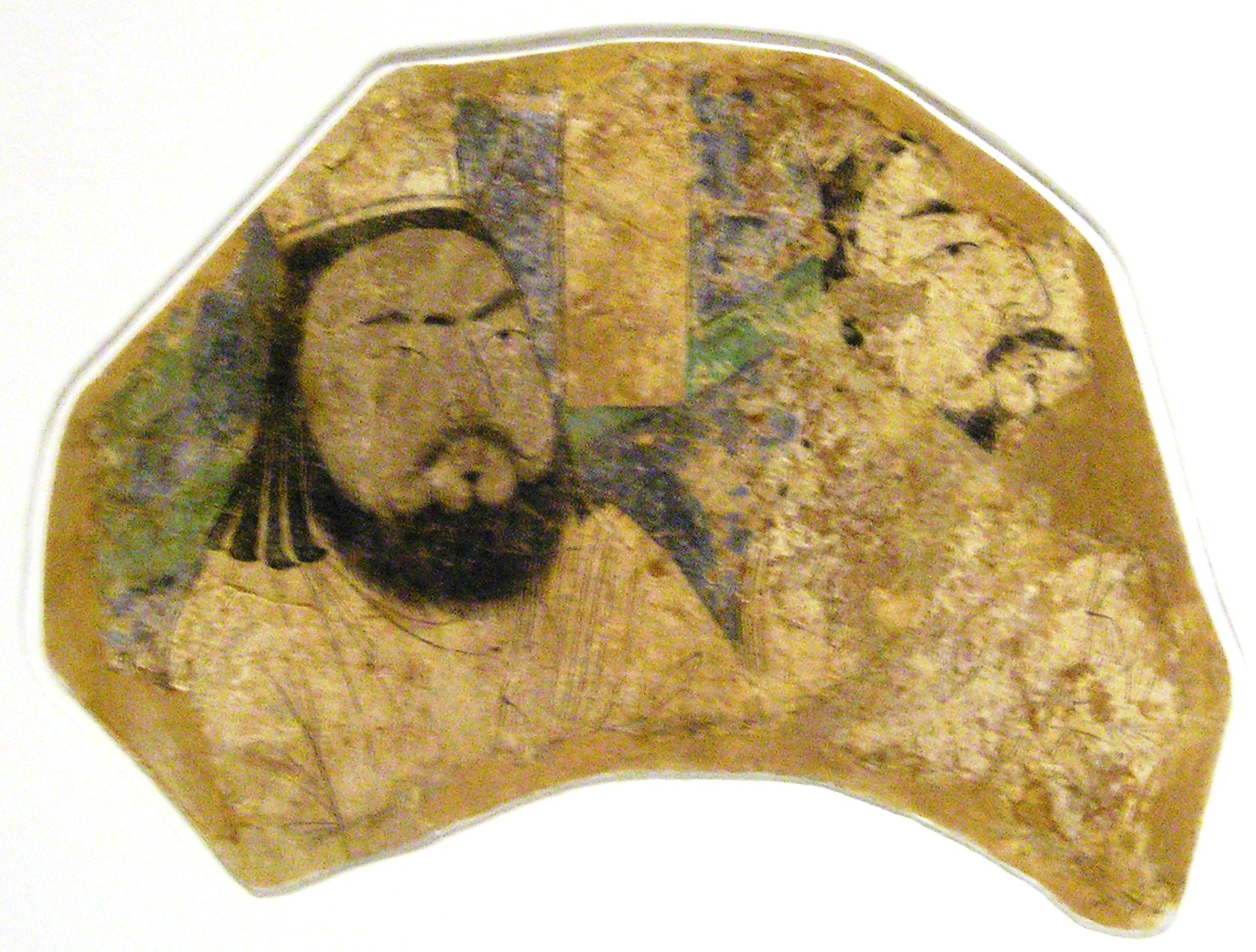
Uyghur Manichaean clergymen from Qocho

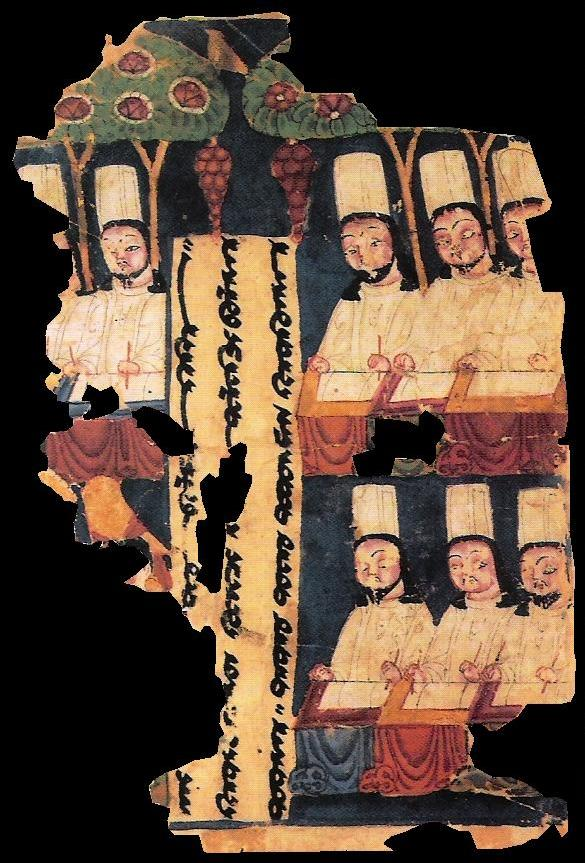
Manicheans from Qocho

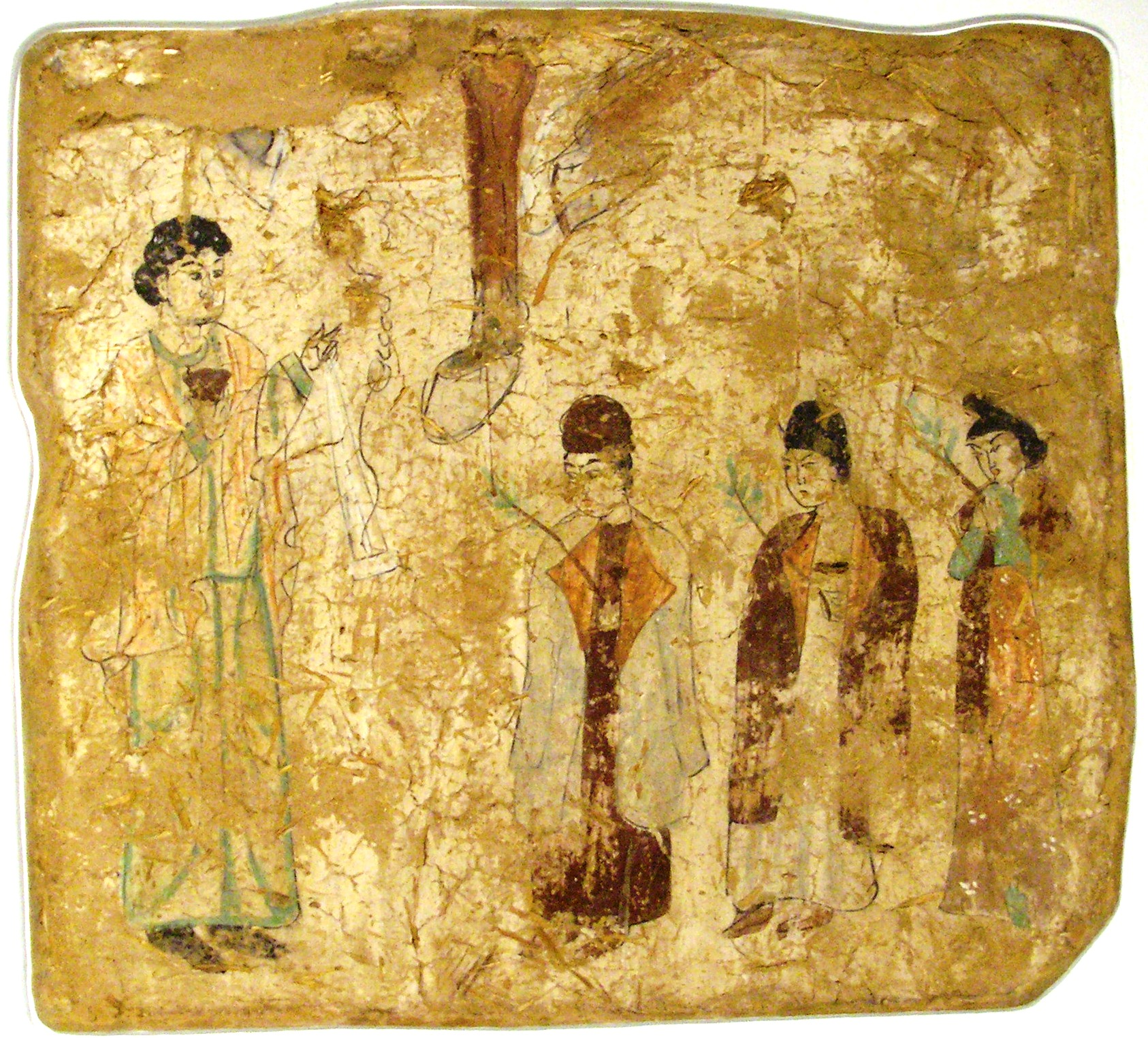
Mural from a Christian temple in Qocho

== See also ==
- Bezeklik Thousand Buddha Caves
- Kara Del
- Ming–Turpan conflict
- Ganzhou Uyghur Kingdom
- Islamization and Turkification of Xinjiang
- History of the Uyghur people
- History of Xinjiang
- Silk Road transmission of Buddhism
