= Albert Grünwedel =

German explorer and author (1856–1935)

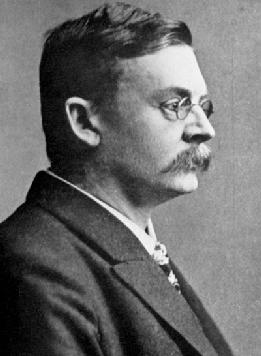
Albert Grünwedel

Albert Grünwedel (31 July 1856 – 28 October 1935) was a German Indologist, Tibetologist, archaeologist, and explorer of Central Asia. He was one of the first scholars to study the Lepcha language.

== Life ==
Grünwedel was born in Munich in 1856, the son of a painter. He studied art history and Asian languages, including Avestan, and in 1883 obtained his doctorate at the Ludwig-Maximilians-Universität München. In 1881, he began work as an assistant at the Museum of Ethnology in Berlin and in 1883 he was appointed deputy director of the ethnographic collection. Grünwedel won accolades for his numerous publications on Buddhist art, archaeology in Central Asia, and Himalayan languages. Two notable works were Buddhist art in India (1893) and Mythology of Buddhism in Tibet and Mongolia (1900), which concerned the Greek origins of the Gandharan Greco-Buddhist artistic style and its development in Central Asia.

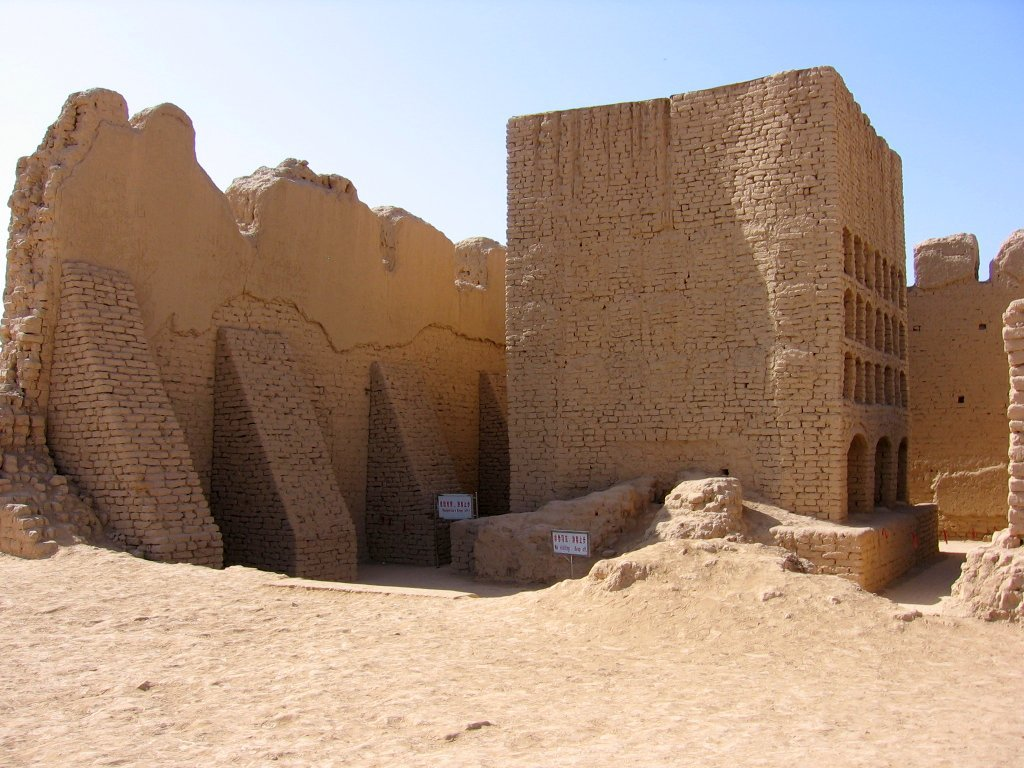
Buddhist stupa at Gaochang.

In 1899, Grünwedel was invited to join a Russian archaeological research expedition led by Vasily Radlov into the north of Xinjiang province, China. In the same year he was appointed a member of the Bavarian Academy of Sciences. In 1902-1903 Grünwedel led the first German expedition to Turpan, in Xinjiang, becoming the first modern European to study the massive ruins near Gaochang. He recorded the events of this expedition in his book Report on Archaeological work in Idikutschahri and Surrounding areas in Winter 1902-1903 (1905). The next expedition was led by Albert von Le Coq, who became famous for removing large numbers of frescos from sites across Xinjiang. Grünwedel himself headed the third German Turfan expedition in 1905–1907, the results of which were published in Ancient Buddhist Religion in Chinese Turkistan (1912). Grünwedel's expeditions were largely funded by the Krupp family. Grünwedel was joined by Heinrich Lüders who made major contributions to the epigraphical analysis of the Turpan-Expedition findings after being called to the Friedrich Wilhelm University of Berlin as Professor for oriental languages in 1909.

Grünwedel retired in 1921, and in 1923 moved to Bavaria, where his spent his last years at Bad Tölz writing a number of scientific papers.

=== Later works ===
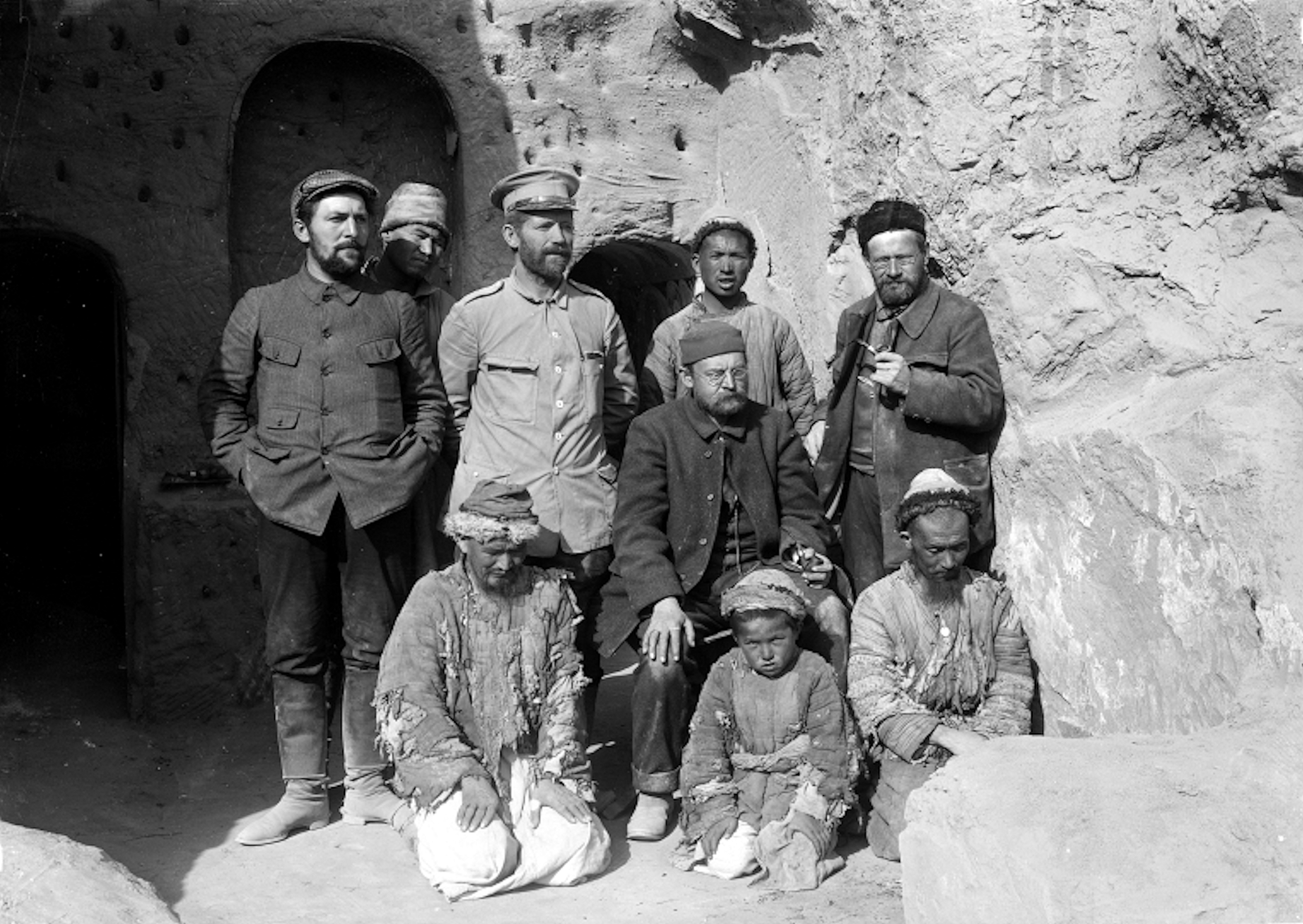
German Expedition at Kizil Caves, in front of Cave 4, in 1906. Albert Grünwedel is seated in the middle, Albert von Le Coq stands to the right, Theodor Bartus is standing in uniform.

A progressive illness, while not depriving him of energy and memory, repeatedly robbed him of the ability to differentiate between delusion and reality, from texts as early as 1920. Waldschmidt writes: “Already in some sections of ‘Alt-Kutscha’ it is difficult to distinguish between things based on facts, speculation and invention,” To an even greater extent this is true for such late works as Die Teufel des Avesta und ihre Beziehungen zur Ikonographie des Buddhismus Zentral-Asiens, Die Legende des Na Ro Pa, or Tusca, in which Grünwedel claimed to have solved the problem of the origins of the Etruscans. Colleagues in the field sharply criticised these works but nevertheless [had] not simply ignored them.

In his later works Grünwedel became obsessed with the false idea that the Indian Buddhist Kālacakra tantra system of mysticism was "a Buddhist modification of Manichaeism" (eine buddhistische Modifizierung des Manichäismus; Alt-Kutscha 1920, p. 1.77). Based upon this delusion, Grünwedel forged "Tibetan" maps of Shambhala, the mythic Central Asian homeland of the Kālacakra, and he forged a Tibetan-language Indian Kālacakra text that claims that Mani, the founder of Manichaeism, was an emanation of the Indian Buddhist deity Avalokiteśvara. Although some have attributed the aberrations in Grünwedel's later works to mental illness, his carefully crafted Kālacakra forgeries exhibit vast Orientalist learning and considerable philological skill.

Despite contemporaneous doubts, Grünwedel's speculations about “Etruscan Satanism” (in his book Tusca) were adopted by Nazi ideologue Alfred Rosenberg for The Myth of the Twentieth Century.

Grünwedel died in a mental hospital in Lenggries in 1935.

== Works ==
1. Hr. Grünwedel spricht über den Fußtapfen des Buddha. Verhandlungen der Berliner Gesellschaft für Anthropologie, Ethnologie und Urgeschichte. 1883,(227)-(232)
2. Das sechste Kapitel des Rupasiddhi, nach drei singhalesischen Päli-Handschriften herausgegeben von Albert Grünwedel. Berlin: Schade 1883. VIII,72 S. Phil. Diss. München v. 15.Mai 1879
3. Amerika 's Nordwest-Küste. Neueste Ergebnisse ethnologischer Reisen. Aus den Sammlungen der Königlichen Museen zu Berlin. Herausgegeben von der Direc-tion der Ethnologischen Abtheilung. Berlin: A. Asher 1883. 13 S., 13 Taf. 2° Neue Folge. Berlin: A. Asher 1884. 1 Kte, 6 S., 11 Taf. 2°
4. Notizen zur Ikonographie des Lamaismus. Von A. Grünwedel. Original-Mittheilungen aus der ethnologischen Abtheilung der Königlichen Museen zu Berlin. 1.1885,38-45,103-131, 1 ( 4)
5. Kurze Charakteristik der «Hill-Tribes». Die Hügelstämme von Chittagong. Ergebnisse einer Reise im Jahre 1882. Von Dr. Emil Riebeck. Berlin: A. Asher & Co. 1885. 2° 3.Abschnitt: Anthropologisches, S.l-5
6. [Review] W. Werner: Das Kaiserreich Ostindien und die angrenzenden Gebirgs-länder [nach den Reisen der Brüder Schlagintweit und anderer neuerer Forscher dargestellt.] Jena: Costenoble 1884. XII,639 S. 8° Verhandlungen der Ges. f. Erdkunde zu Berlin. 12.1885,125-126
7. A. Grünwedel: Indien. Jahresberichte der Geschichtswissenschaft, im Auftrage der Historischen Gesellschaft zu Berlin hrsg. von J. Hermann, J. Jastrow, Edm. Meyer.5-8. Berlin: R. Gaertner. 5.1882[1886].I,51-72 6.1883[1888].I,52-72 7.1884 [1888]. I,44-70 8.1885[1889] .I,41-68 Hrsg. von J. Jastrow.
8. Hr. Grünwedel legt Acht Schädelschalen der Aghöri vor und berichtet darüber. Verhandlungen der Berliner Gesellschaft f. Anthropologie, Ethnologie und Urgeschichte. 1888,(307)-(308)
9. Das Pantheon des Tschangtscha Hutuktu. Ein Beitrag zur Iconographie des Lamaismus von Eugen Pander. Hrsg. und mit Inhaltsverzeichnissen versehen von Albert Grünwedel. Veröffentlichungen aus dem Kgl. Museum für Völkerkunde. 1.1890,45-116,301. Rez.: Russkoe obozrenie. 1890 [?], 932-936 (E. Uchtomskij)
10. Hr. Grünwedel teilt Folgendes mit über die Reise des Herrn A. Bastian. Verhandlungen der Berliner Gesellschaft für Anthropologie. 22.1890,(613)-(614)
11. Hr. Grünwedel gibt folgenden Bericht über die Reise des Herrn Bastian [Terrakotten aus Afräsiäb bei Samarkand]. Verhandlungen der Berliner Gesellschaft für Anthropologie. 22.1890,(347)-(349)
12. Der zeitige Vertreter des Direktors der ethnologischen Abteilung des Museums für Völkerkunde, Hr. Grünwedel, übermittelt mit einem Schreiben ... einen .... Bericht... betreffend Rio grandenser Alterthümer. Verhandlungen der Berliner Gesellschaft für Anthropologie, Ethnologie und Urgeschichte. 1890,(31 )-(37)
13. Hr. Grünwedel überreicht einen Brief des Hrn. H. H. Risley .... betreffend die Förderung der ethnologischen Untersuchungen in Indien. Verhandlungen der Berliner Gesellschaft für Anthropologie, Ethnologie und Urgeschichte.23.\ 891, (83)-(85)
14. Hr. Grünwedel spricht, unter Vorlegung einer reichen Collection ethnographischer Gegenstände, über Die Reisen des Hrn. Vaughan Stevens in Malacca. Verhandlungen der Berliner Gesellschaft f. Anthropologie, Ethnologie und Urgeschichte. 23.1891, (829)-(837), 1
15. [Review] Archaeological Survey of India. The Sharqi architecture of Jaunpur; with notes on Zafarabad, Sahet-Mahet and other places in the northwestern provinces and Oudh by A. Führer Ph.D., with drawings and architectural descriptions by Ed. W. Smith, edited by Jas. Burgess. Calkutta 1889. Mit 74 Tafeln. Zeitschrift für Ethnologie. 23.1891,39-40 Grünwedel
16. [Review] Alois Raimund Hein: Die bildenden Künste bei den Dayaks auf Borneo; ein Beitrag zur allgemeinen Kunstgeschichte. Wien: Alfred Holder 1890. Verhandlungen der Gesellschaft für Erdkunde zu Berlin. 18.1891,195-196 Grünwedel
17. A Röng-English glossary. Compiled by Albert Grünwedel. Toung Pao.3.1892,238-309 Leiden: Brill 1892.
18. Königliche Museen zu Berlin. - Materialien zur Kenntniss der wilden Stämme auf der Halbinsel Maläka. Von Hrolf Vaughan Stevens. [Herausgegeben von A. Grünwedel.] Berlin: W. Spemann 1892. 4° VII S., S.81-163 mit 55 Zinkdrucken, 1 Übersichtskarte (Veröffentlichungen aus dem Kgl. Museum f. Völkerkunde.2:3/4.) V-VII: Vorrede, gez.: Berlin, im März 1892.
19. Königliche Museen zu Berlin. - Materialien zur Kenntniss der wilden Stämme auf der Halbinsel Maläka. Von Hrolf Vaughan Stevens. Herausgegeben von A. Grünwedel. 2.Theil. Berlin: W. Spemann 1894. VIII S., S.96-190. 4° (Veröffentlichungen aus dem Kgl. Museum f. Völkerkunde.3.1894:3/4.) V-VIII: Vorrede, gez.: Albert Grünwedel
20. Hr. Grünwedel: [Photographie von Schädel und Hand eines Batak.] Verhandlungen der Berliner Gesellschaft für Anthropologie, Ethnologie und Urgeschichte.\S92,(\27)
21. Hr. Grünwedel legt eine Darstellung des Dämons Hüniyanyakshayä oder Süniyanyakshayä vor. Verhandlungen der Berliner Gesellschaft für Anthropologie, Ethnologie und Urgeschichte. 1892,(511) [Aus Ceylon.]
22. Hr. Grünwedel macht weitere Mitteilungen über die Forschungsreise des Hrn. Stevens, insbesondere über die Orang-Panggang und Orang-Benüa. Verhandlungen der Berliner Gesellschaft für Anthropologie, Ethnologie und Urgeschichte. 1892, (465)-(46S), 1
23. [Review] William Woodville Rockhill: The land of the Lamas; notes of a journey through China, Mongolia and Tibet, with maps and illustrations. London: Long-man, Green & Co. 1891. Zeitschrift für Ethnologie.24.1892,238-240
24. Buddhistische Kunst in Indien. Von Albert Grünwedel. Mit 76 Abbildungen. Berlin: W. Spemann 1893. VIII, 177 S. 1.8° (Handbücher der Königlichen Museen zu Berlin, mit Abbildungen.Bd 4.) Rez.: A. Foucher: L'art bouddhique dans l'Inde d'apres un livre recent. Revue de l'histoire des religions.30.1894,319-371; SD 1895. 53 S. MSOS 5.1902, 155–156. Bulletin de l'Académie des Sciences. V,14 (S. Oldenburg). T'oung Pao 1,5.1894,92-93 (G. Schlegel)
25. Pflichten der Religiosen und Laien im südlichen Buddhismus. Von Prof. A. Grünwedel, Berlin. Globus.63.1893,233-238,1
26. Sinhalesische Masken. Von Prof. Dr. Albert Grünwedel, Directorial Assistant am Kgl. Museum für Völkerkunde, Berlin. (Mit Taf. VI-X). Internationales Archiv für Ethnographie.6.1893,71-88, 1 u. 4 Taf. Das Yakun-nätima, der Teufelstanz. Das Sanni-yakun-nätima.
27. Die Zaubermuster 1. der Orang Semang 2.der Orang Hütan in Malakka. Nach den Materialien des Herrn Hrolf Vaughan Stevens bearbeitet von A. Grünwedel: 1. Die Kämme. Zeitschrift für Ethnologie.25.1893,71-100, 4 Taf.
28. [Review] F. J. Wershofen: Lehr- und Lesebuch der Siamesischen Sprache und Deutsch-Siamesisches Wörterbuch. Zum Selbststudium mit phonetischer Aussprachebezeichnung, Übungsaufgaben u. Lesebuch. Wien, Pest, Leipzig 1892. VII, 181 S. (Hartlebens Bibliothek der Sprachenkunde.) Literar. Zentralblatt. 1893, Sp.372 Grwdl.
29. Bemerkungen über das Kilin. Feestbundel van taal-, letter-, geschied- en aardrijkskundige bijdragen ter gelegenheid van zijn tachtigsten geboortedag aan Dr. P[ieter] J[ohannes] Veth, oudhoogl. door eenige vrienden en oudleerlingen aangeboden. Leiden: Brill 1894,223-225 Berlin. Albert Grünwedel
30. König Maname. Ethnologisches Notizblatt. 1.1894:1, S.l-6, 10
31. [Review] Journal of the Buddhist Text Society of India. Edited by Sarat Candradäs C. I. E. Calcutta 1893. Vo.l und Vol. 2, Heft 1. Ethnologisches Notizblatt. 1.1894:1, S.58 Grünwedel
32. Beschreibung der tibetischen und südindischen Handschriften in Göttingen. Verzeichnis der Handschriften im preußischen Staate, hrsg. von W. Meyer: I.Hannover.3.Die Handschriften in Göttingen.Bd 3. Berlin: A. Bath 1894. VIIL551,244 S.
33. Prähistorisches aus Birma. Globus.68. 1895,14-15, 1 Albert Grünwedel Zu: Fritz Nötling: Werkzeuge der Steinperiode in Birma. Verhandlungen der Gesellschaft für Anthropologie.26, S.588-593
34. [Review] H. H. Risley: The gazetteer of Sikhim. Calkutta 1894. XIV, XXII, 392 S., 21 Taf. 2Ktn. 8° Ethnologisches Notizblatt. 1.1895:2,93 Albert Grünwedel
35. Notizen über Indisches. 1. Pasten aus Pagan, Oberbirma. 2. Parnaka; Kapardin. 3. Padmasambhava-Legenden in Lepcha-Sprache. Ethnologisches Notizblatt. 1.1894/96:2(1895), S.6-11,4 Grünwedel
36. Ein Kapitel des Te-se-sun. Von Albert Grünwedel. Festschrift für Adolf Bastian zu seinem 70.Geburtstage, 26. Juni 1896. Berlin: Reimer 1896,459-482
37. Drei Leptscha Texte. Mit Auszügen aus dem Padma-thaii-yig und Glossar. Bearbeitet von Albert Grünwedel. T'oung Pao.7. 1896,526-561
38. Notizen aus den Reisen des Hrolf Vaughan Stevens in Maläka. Ethnologisches Notizblatt. 1.1894/96:3( 1896) S. 1 -11. 9 Grünwedel
39. Notizen über eine Terracotta aus Magdischu. Ethnologisches Notizblatt. 1.1894/96:3(1896), S.12-14, 4 Grünwedel
40. Bericht über den Besuch des Königlichen Schlosses zu Schwedt zur Besichtigung alter Gemälde mit ethnographischen Darstellungen. Ethnologisches Notizblatt. 1.1894/96:3(1896) S.15-22, 14 Grünwedel
41. [coeditor?] Amtliche Berichte aus den Kgl. Kunstsammlungen: Jahrbuch der Kgl. Preuß. Kunstsammlungen - Museum für Völkerkunde: I.Ethnologische Abteilung. 18.1896ff.
42. [Review] G. U. Pope: Munivar arulicceyda Näladiyar; the Näladiyar or four hundred quatrains in Tamil. Oxford: Clarendon Press 1893. 440 S. 8° Deutsche Literaturzeitung. 17.1896,1028-1029 Berlin.
43. Buddhistische Studien. Von Albert Grünwedel. Mit 97 Abbildungen. Berlin: Geographische Verlagsanstalt Dietrich Reimer (Ernst Vohsen) 1897. 136
44. [Review] Georg Huth, Dr.: Geschichte des Buddhismus in der Mongolei. Aus dem Tibetischen des 'Jigs.med nam.mk'a herausgegeben, übersetzt u. erläutert von -. 1 .Teil: Vorrede, Text, kritische Anmerkungen. Strassburg: Karl J. Trübner 1893. X,296 S. - 2. Teil: Nachträge, Übersetzung. Ibid. 1896 Wiener Z für die Kunde des Morgenlandes. 12.1898,70-74
45. Dictionary of the Lepcha-language. Compiled by the late General G. B. Mainwaring, revised and completed by Albert Grünwedel. Berlin: Unger 1898. XVI,549 S.
46. Padmasambhava und Mandärava. Von Albert Grünwedel. Zeitschrift der Deutschen Morgenländischen Gesellschaft. 52.1898,447-461
47. Bhrikutf. Ethnologisches Notizblatt.2.1899,6-10, 2 Albert Grünwedel
48. [Review] Karl Eugen Neumann: Die Lieder der Mönche und Nonnen Gotamo Buddho's, aus dem Theragäthä und Therigäthä zum erstenmal übersetzt. Berlin: Ernst Hofmann & Co. 1899. 392 S. 8° Ethnolog. Notizblatt.2.1899:1, S.55 Albert Grünwedel
49. Zur buddhistischen Ikonographie. Von Albert Grünwedel. Globus.75.1899,169-177, 16
50. Herr Professor A. Grünwedel aus Berlin: Die kunstgeschichtliche Stellung der sogenannten gräco-buddhistischen Kunst. Jahresbericht des Frankfurter Vereins für Geographie und Statistik. 61/63. 1899,66-67
51. Mythologie des Buddhismus in Tibet und der Mongolei. Führer durch die lamaistische Sammlung des Fürsten E. Uchtomskij. Von Albert Grünwedel, Dr.phil. Mit einem einleitenden Vorwort des Fürsten E. Uchtomskij und 188 Abbildungen. Leipzig: Brockhaus 1900. XXXV,244 S., 188 Reviews: Globus.78. 1900,129 (B. Laufer). Deutsches Protestantenblatt 1900,418 (Achelis). Deutsche Rundschau. Jan. 1900,155 (ßlambdafix.); Okt., 120ff. (Lady Blennerhasett). Westermanns III. Monatshefte 1900, Okt., 143 (F. D.) Deutsche Worte. 1900,219. Zeitschrift für Bücherfreunde .4.1900,306 (G. Stein). Wiener Zeitschrift für die Kunde des Morgenlandes 1900,352 (L. v. Schröder). Allgemeine Zeitung, Beilage. 1900, Nr 200, S.7-8 (M[aasJ.). Das literarische Echo. 1900,1439 (P. Lindenberg). Ostasien.3.1900,272. Allgemeines Litteraturblatt. 1901, Nr 11 (Jostenode). Kölnische Volkszeitung. 1900, Beil. 32, S.245-247 (D-n)
52. Mythologie du Bouddhisme au Tibet et en Mongolie basee sur la collection lamaique du prince Oukhtomsky par Albert Grünwedel, Dr.phil. Traduit de l'allemand par Ivan Goldschmidt. 188 illustrations. Paris: Leroux 1900. XXXVII.247 S., 1 Bildn., 188 Leipzig: F. A. Brockhaus 1900. Reviews: Revue critique. 1900. Nr 51, S.471-472 (Sylvain Levi). T'oung-pao 11,1.1900,349-353 (G. Schlegel). Luzac's Oriental List. 11.1900,181.
53. Bronzen aus Chotan. Aus der Sammlung N. F. Petrovskij's. Übersetzt von Albert Grünwedel. Globus 77.1900,72-75,9 [Chotanskija bronzy iz sobranija N. F. Petrovskago]
54. [Review] Max Morris: Die Mentawai-Sprache. Berlin: Conrad Skopnik 1900. VIL356 S. Globus.lS. 1900,16-17 Berlin.
55. [Review] H. Francke: Aus der Kesar-Sage. Separatabzug aus den Mémoires de la Société finno-ougrienne. Globus. 78.1900,97-98 Berlin. Albert Grünwedel
56. Alterthümer aus der Malakand- und Swat-Gegend: Die Bedeutung der Skulpturen. Von Albert Grünwedel. Berlin: Akademie der Wissenschaften 1901,1, 208-217 (Sitzungsberichte der Kgl. Preuß. Akademie der Wissenschaften. Philos.-histor. Kl. 1901.)
57. Buddhist art in India. Translated from the «Handbuch» of Prof. Albert Grünwedel by Agnes C. Gibson, revised and enlarged by Jas. Burgess, C.I.E., LL.D., F.R.S.E. &c, late Director-General of the Archaeological Survey of India. With 154 illustrations. London: Bernard Quaritch 1901. VIIL229 S. gr.8° Rez.: 2MNP 343.1902 (S. von Oldenburg)
58. Temples and archaeological treasures of Burma. By Dr. Albert Grünwedel. Open Court. 15.1901,464-479
59. Bilder zur Kesarsage. Von Albert Grünwedel. Globus.79.1901,281-283, 2
60. [Aus dem 17.Kapitel: Flucht des Padamsambhava aus dem Hause seines königlichen Pflegevaters Indrabhuti.] Marksteine aus der Weltliteratur in Originalschriften. Herausgegeben von Johannes Baensch-Drugulin. Buchschmuck von L. Sütterlin. Leipzig: Drugulin 1902,113-115 Berlin, im August 1901.
61. Über Darstellungen von Schlangengöttern (Nägas) auf den Reliefs der sogenannten gräkobuddhistischen Kunst. Von Albert Grünwedel. Globus 81.1902,26-30, 6
62. Einige praktische Bemerkungen über archäologische Arbeiten in Chinesisch-Turkistan. St.-Petersburg 1903. Von Prof. Dr. Albert Grünwedel. Bulletin de l'Association internationale pour l'exploration historique, archeologique, linguistique et ethnographique de l'Asie Centrale et de l'Extreme-Orient, publie par le Comite Russe.2.[Okt.]1903, 7-16
63. Î sobranii buddijskich statuetok, obrazov i drugich predmetov buddijskago kul'ta kn. E. E. Uchtomskago. Zapiski VORAO 15.1902/03,11
64. Die Kunst im alten Indien. Von Dr. Albert Grünwedel. Allgemeine Geschichte der bildenden Künste. Berlin: Baumgärtel [1903].Teil 1, 2. Hälfte, S.543-612, 93
65. Bericht über archäologische Forschungen in Turfan und Umgebung (Nov. 1902-Febr.1903). Bulletin de l'Association internationale pour l'exploration historique, archeologique, linguistique et ethnographique de l'Asie Centrale et de l'Extreme-Orient, publie par le Comite Russe.3 [April] 1904, 18-25
66. Bericht über archäologische Arbeiten in Idikutschari und Umgebung im Winter 1902–1903. Von Albert Grünwedel. München: Verlag der Ê. Â. Akademie der Wissenschaften; G. Franz (J. Roth) in Komm. 1905. 196 S., 19 Ktn., 164 Fig. im Text, XXXI Taf. 4° (Abhandlungen der Kgl. Bayr. Akademie der Wissenschaften. 1.Kl., Bd 25:1.) Reviews: Bulletin de l'Ecole Francaise d'Extreme-Orient 6.1896,442-444 (A. F.) Bericht über archäologische Arbeiten in Idikutschari und Umgebung im Winter 1902-1903 : vol.1
67. Sceny iz zizni Buddy v «Traj-Pume» [Szenen aus dem Leben Buddhas im «Trai P'um»] St. Petersburg: Akademija nauk 1904. Zapiski vostocnogo otdelenija Imp. Russk. archeolog. obscestva. 16.1904/05, 075–076, 4 A. Grjunvedel'
68. Obzor sobranija predmetov lamajskago kul'ta kn. ¨. ¨. Uchtomskago. Sostavil A. Grjunvedel'. Cast' 1–2. Sanktpeterburg: Imperatorskaja Akademika Nauk 1905. (Bibliotheca Buddhica.6.) 1. Tekst.138 S.
69. Zur Erinnerung an Adolf Bastian. Jahrbuch der Kgl. Preuß. Kunstsammlungen.26.1905, V-VIII, 1 Albert Grün wedel
70. Der Lamaismus.Von Albert Grünwedel. Berlin u.Leipzig: B. G. Teubner 1906, 136-161
71. Museum für Völkerkunde: Kopfbedeckungen der türkischen Bevölkerung von Hami. Amtliche Berichte aus den kgl. Kunstsammlungen.29.1907/08, Sp. 322–324,2
72. Chinesisch Turkistan und seine Bedeutung für die Kulturgeschichte. Von Prof. Dr. Albert Grünwedel, Direktor an der ethnologischen Abteilung des Museums für Völkerkunde, Berlin. Dt. Literaturzeitung.29.1908,580-592
73. Kratkija zametki î buddijskom iskusstve v Turfane. Zapiski vostoänago otdelenija Imp. Russk. archeol. obscestva. 18.1907/08,068-073
74. Altertümer aus Borazan. Amtliche Berichte aus den Kgl. Kunstsammlungen. 30.1908/1909, Sp. 122–124,
75. Buddhistisches Wandgemälde aus Qyzyl bei Kutscha. Amtliche Berichte aus den Kgl. Kunstsammlungen. 30.1908/09, Sp. 171–176, 2
76. Herr Grünwedel hält alsdann einen Vortrag mit Lichtbildern über: Die archäologischen Ergebnisse der dritten Turfan-Expedition. Zeitschrift für Ethnologie.41.1909,891 -916,22
77. [Review] Hans Leder: Das geheimnisvolle Tibet. Reisefrüchte aus dem geistlichen Reiche des Dalai Lama. Leipzig 1909. VIII, 110 S., 10 Taf. Orientalistische Literaturzeitung. 13.1909,371 -372
78. Museum für Völkerkunde: Jaina-Skulpturen. Amtliche Berichte aus den kgl. Kunstsammlungen.31.1909/10, Sp. 55–58, 2
79. Die politische Wirksamkeit des Buddhismus. Von Dr. Albert Grünwedel. Zeitschrift für Politik.4. 1911,301-328
80. [Review] Castes and tribes of Southern India by Edgar Thurston C. I. E., assisted by K. Rangachari M.A. 7 vols. Madras: Government Press 1909. Zeitschrift für Ethnologie 43.1911,176-177 Grünwedel
81. Altbuddhistische Kultstätten in Chinesisch Turkistan. Bericht über archäologische Arbeiten von 1906 bis 1907 bei Kuca, QaraSahr und in der Oase Turfan. Von Albert Grünwedel. Mit 1 Tafel und 678 Fig. Herausgegeben mit Unterstützung des Baeßler-Instituts in Berlin. Berlin: Georg Reimer 1912. 370 S., 1 Farbtaf. 4° review: Ostasiatische Zeitschrift 1.1912/13,479-482 (J. Strzygowski) Altbuddhistische Kultstätten in Chinesisch-Turkistan : vol.1
82. Berthold Laufer: Der Roman einer tibetischen Königin. Tibetischer Text und Übersetzung. Mit 8 lamaistischen Abbildungen nach den Originalen gezeichnet von Prof. Grünwedel. Leipzig: Harrassowitz 1911. X,264 S. 8°
83. Padmasambhava und Verwandtes. Von Albert Grünwedel. Baeßler-Archiv.3.1912, 1-37,2 u. 2 Taf.; Nachtr. 256
84. Deli. Von Albert Grünwedel. Bäßler-Archiv.4. 1913,46 S.66-69.
85. Bka' babs bdun Idan. Täranätha's Edelsteinmine, das Buch von den Vermittlern der Sieben Inspirationen. Aus dem Tibetischen übersetzt von Albert Grünwedel. I-II. Petrograd: Academie Imperiale des Sciences 1914. 212 S. 8° (Bibliotheca Buddhica. 18.)
86. Eine weibliche Inkarnation in Tibet. Von Albert Grünwedel in Berlin. Archiv für Religionswissenschaft. 17.1914,437-454
87. Aus Fedor Jagor's Nachlaß. Mit Unterstützung der Jagor-Stiftung herausgegeben von der Berliner Gesellschaft für Anthropologie, Ethnologie und Urgeschichte unter Leitung von Albert Grünwedel. l.Band. Südindische Volksstämme. Berlin: Dietrich Reimer (Ernst Vohsen) 1914. IV,153 S., 160 Fig., 6 Taf., 1 Titelbildn.
88. Der Weg nach Sambhala <Samb'alai lam yig> des dritten Groß-Lama von bKra sis lhun po bLo bzan dPal ldan Ye ses. Aus dem tibetischen Original übersetzt und mit dem Texte herausgegeben von Albert Grünwedel. (Vorgelegt am 5.Dezember 1914.) München: G. Franz in Komm. 1915. 118 S., 1, 4 Taf. 4° (Abhandlungen der Königlich Bayerischen Akademie der Wissenschaften. Philosophisch-philologische und historische Klasse.29,3.)
89. Die Geschichten der vierundachtzig Zauberer (Mahäsiddhas). Aus dem Tibetischen übersetzt von Albert Grünwedel. (Mit 10 Figuren im Text.) Bäßler-Archiv.5.1916,137-228, 10
90. [Editor] Der indische Kulturkreis in Einzeldarstellungen. München: Georg Müller. Karl Döhring: Buddhistische Tempelanlagen in Siam. 1916
91. Athene-Vajrapäni. Von Albert Grünwedel. Jahrbuch der Kgl. Preuß. Kunstsammlungen.31.1916,174-180,5
92. Näro und Tilo. Von Albert Grünwedel (Berlin). Aufsätze zur Kultur- und Sprachgeschichte, vornehmlich des Orients, Ernst Kuhn zum 70.Geburtstage 7.II.1916 gewidmet. Breslau: Marcus 1916,119-130, 2
93. Die Tempel von Lhasa. Gedicht des ersten Dalailama, für Pilger bestimmt, aus dem tibetischen Texte mit dem Kommentar ins Deutsche übersetzt von Albert Grünwedel in Berlin. Eingegangen am 30.Juni 1919. Vorgelegt von C. Bezold. Heidelberg: Carl Winter 1919. 92 S.,1 Plan. (Sitzungsberichte d. Heidelberger Akademie der Wissenschaften. Philosophisch-histor. Klasse. 1919:14.)
94. Indische Albums und ihre Bedeutung für die Ethnographie und Archäologie. Berliner Museen. Berichte aus den Preußischen Kunstsammlungen. 41.1919/20, Sp.163-176, 53-58
95. Alt-Kutscha. Archäologische und religionsgeschichtliche Forschungen an Tempera-Gemälden aus buddhistischen Höhlen der ersten acht Jahrhunderte nach Christi Geburt. Von Professor Dr. Albert Grünwedel, Geheimer Regierungsrat und Direktor beim Museum für Völkerkunde, Mitglied der Russischen und Bayerischen Akademie der Wissenschaften. Berlin: Otto Eisner 1920. 89,118 S., 173, 49 Taf. gr.4° (Veröffentlichungen der Preußischen Turfan-Expeditionen. Mit Unterstützung d. Alt-Kutscha : vol.1 Bäßlerinstituts.) Reviews: OLZ 1921,101-109,145-154 (Hans Haas), Ostasiatische Zeitschrift 7.1918/19,245-246 (Selbstanz.), Zeitschrift für Ethnologie.52/53,1920/21,488-490 (H. v. Glasenapp)
96. [Review] Dr. W. Kirfel: Die Kosmographie der Inder nach den Quellen dargestellt. Mit 18 Tafeln. Bonn, Leipzig: Kurt Schroeder 1920. Zeitschrift für Ethnologie.52/53,1920/21,306-307 Albert Grün wedel
97. Ein Gandhära-Relief der Sammlung Leitner und Verwandtes. Von Albert Grünwedel. Berliner Museen. Berichte aus den Preuß. Kunstsammlungen. 42.1920/21,51-54, 3
98. Post tenebras lux. Von Professor Dr. Albert Grünwedel, Geheimer Regierungsrat und Direktor beim Museum für Völkerkunde. Festgabe dargebracht dem Verlage Otto Elsner zum I.Juli 1921. Berlin: Elsner [1921], S.185-194, 4
99. Die tibetische Übersetzung von Kälidäsas Meghaduta 38 (36). Von Albert Grünwedel. Festschrift Adalbert Bezzenberger z. 14.April 1921, dargebracht von seinen Freunden und Schülern. Göttingen: Vandenhoeck & Ruprecht 1921, S.60-67, 5
100. [Review] Karl Doehring [Prof. Dr.phil., iur. et ing., z. Zt. in Nürnberg]: Buddhistische Tempelanlagen in Siam. 3 Bde. Berlin: Vereinigung wissenschaftlicher Verleger (W. de Gruyter) 1920. 356 S.; VIII S., 90 Taf.; VIII S., 90 Taf. Deutsche Literaturzeitung. 1921,427-428
101. Angeblich dekorative Elemente der Gandhära-Skulpturen.Von Albert Grünwedel. Berliner Museen. Berichte aus den preuß. Kunstsammlungen. 43.1922,21-27, 10
102. Die Sternschnuppen im Vaidürya dkar po. Von Albert Grünwedel. Mit vier Abbildungen. Festschrift Eduard Seier dargebracht zum 70.Geburtstag von Freunden, Schülern u. Verehrern. Stuttgart: Strecker & Schröder 1922, S. 129–146,4
103. Tusca. 1. Die Agramer Mumienbinden. 2. Die Inschrift des Cippus von Perugia. 3. Die Pulena-Rolle. 4. Das Bleitäfelchen von Magliano. 5. Die Leber von Piacenza. 6. Golini-Grab.I. 7. Die Inschrift von Capua. Unter Zuziehung anderen sachlich zugehörigen archäologischen Materials übersetzt. Additum est glossarium Tusco-Latinum. Leipzig: Hiersemann 1922. 228 S., 50
104. [Review] S. H. Ribbach: Vier Bilder des Padmasambhava und seiner Gefolgschaft. Mitteilungen aus dem Museum für Völkerkunde in Hamburg 1917, 5.Beiheft. 63 S., 5 Taf., 69 im Text. Orientalistische Literaturzeitung. 25.1922,430-431
105. Tibetanische Zaubermärchen. Das Kunstblatt.6. 1922,309-310
106. Die Teufel des Avesta und ihre Beziehungen zur Ikonographie des Buddhismus Zentral-Asiens. Von Professor Dr. Albert Grünwedel, geheimer Regierungsrat und Direktor em. beim Museum für Völkerkunde, Mitglied der Russischen und Bayerischen Akademie der Wissenschaften. Berlin: Otto Elsner 1924. 448,113 S.,94 gr.4° Auflage: 400 Exemplare Widmung: In memoriam gloriosissimi viri qui nobis primus sanctam veterum Aegyptiorum scripturam correcte enucleavit, Champollion. Reviews: OLZ 1927,796-797 (E. v. Zach) Die Teufel des Avesta und Ihre Beziehungen zur Ikonographie des Buddhismus Zentral-Asiens : vol.1
107. [Review] Meister Jämmerling oder: Die Abenteuer des Guru Paramartan. Ein tamulisches Narrenbüchlein in freier Wiedergabe von Otto Wolfgang. Mit Zeichnungen von Viktor Leyrer. Hannover: Orientbuchhandlung Heinz Lafaire 1927. 60 S. Völkischer Beobachter.220: 24.9.1927, Beil. 17 A. Gr.
108. Grünwedels Buddhistische Kunst in Indien, unter Mitarbeit von R. L. Waldschmidt völlig neu gestaltet von Ernst Waldschmidt. 1 .Teil. Berlin-Lankwitz: Würfel-Verlag 1932. 125 S., 95 auf 50 Taf. kl. 8° (Handbücher der Staatl. Museen zu Berlin. Museum für Völkerkunde.) Widmung: Heinrich Lüders in dankbarer Verehrung gewidmet.
109. Die Legenden des Na ro pa, des Hauptvertreters des Nekromanten- und Hexentums. Nach einer alten tibetischen Handschrift als Beweis für die Beeinflussung des nördlichen Buddhismus durch die Geheimlehre der Manichäer. Übersetzt, in Umschrift herausgegeben und mit einem Glossar versehen von Albert Grünwedel. Mit 19 Strichätzungen und 1 Abbildung des Originaltextes. Leipzig: Otto Harrassowitz 1933. 250 S., 20 Reviews: OLZ 1934,709-711 (J. Schubert), DLZ1935.2205-2212 (Joh. Nobel)
110. Buddhist art in India. Translated from the «Handbuch» of Prof. Albert Grünwedel by Agnes C. Gibson, revised and enlarged by Jas. Burgess, C.I.E., LL.D., F.R.S.E. &c, late Director-General of the Archaeological Survey of India. With 154 illustrations. Santiago de Compostela, London: Susil Gupta (1965). VII,22 S. gr.8° Nachdr. der Ausg. 1901.
111. Albert Grünwedel: Mythologie des Buddhismus in Tibet und der Mongolei. Führer durch die lamaistische Sammlung des Fürsten E. Uchtomskij. Mit einem einleitenden Vorwort des Fürsten E. Uchtomskij und 188 Abbildungen. Neudruck der Ausgabe (Leipzig: Brockhaus) 1900. Osnabrück: Otto Zeller 1970. XXXV,244 S. 8° Reviews: OE 30.1983/1986(1988),294-295 (Hartmut Walravens)

== Works about Grünwedel ==
- H. G. Franz, Kunst und Kultur entlang der Seidenstraße, Graz 1986.
- G. Grönbold, Grünwedels Naropa-Handschrift, Central Asian Journal 17/4, 1974, S. 251–252.
- Hartmut Walravens (Hg.), G. Grönbold, Briefwechsel und Dokumente, Wiesbaden 2001.
- H. Hoffmann, Grünwedel, Neue Deutsche Biographie VII, Berlin, 1966, S. 204–205.
- H. Hoffmann, Ein Bild Grünwedels, in: W. Rau (Hg.), Bilder hundert deutscher Indologen, Wiesbaden, 1965, S. 60.
- R. F. G. Müller, Albert Grünwedel, Mitteilungen zur Geschichte der Medizin, der Naturwissenschaften und der Technik 35, 1936, S. 255.
- J. Schubert, Albert Grünwedel und sein Werk, Artibus Asiæ 6, 1936, S. 124–142.
- V. Stache-Rosen, German Indologists: Biographies of Scholars in Indian Studies Writing in German, New Delhi, 1981, S. 138–140, 1990.
- Ernst Waldschmidt, Albert Grünwedel, Ostasiatische Zeitschrift, N.S. 11/5, 1935, pp. 215–19.
- Hartmut Walravens, Schriftenverzeichnis Albert Grünwedel.
