= Heinz Bechert =

German indologist (1932–2005)

Heinz Bechert (26 June 1932, Munich – 14 June 2005, Göttingen) was a German Indologist and Buddhologist.

== Life ==
The son of lawyer Rudolf Bechert and his wife, Herta (née Bade), from 1965 to 2000, Heinz Bechert held the Chair of Indology at the University of Göttingen. In 1971, on his initiative, the former "Indological Seminar" was renamed "Seminar for Indology and Buddhist Studies".

Bechert's research focused on Indology and Buddhism with a focus on Theravada Buddhism in Sri Lanka, Southeast Asia and Nepal. In addition, he dealt with Buddhist Sanskrit tradition in Central Asia as well as the political and social significance of the Buddhist religious community up to the present day.

His language skills included Sanskrit, Middle Indian languages (Pali, several Prakrits), Lhasa Tibetan, the Sinhala language and the Burmese language.

Bechert published numerous scientific papers and works. Together with Ernst Waldschmidt, he was editor of the Sanskrit-Wörterbuch der buddhistischen Texte aus den Turfan-Funden ("Sanskrit dictionary of Buddhist texts from the Turfan finds").

== Memberships ==
- Académie royale de Belgique in Brussels
- Kungl. Vitterhets Historie och Antikvitets Akademie (Royal Swedish Academy)
- Membership in the board of trustees for the Institute for Cultural and Intellectual History of Asia of the Austrian Academy of Sciences
- Royal Asiatic Society, Sri Lanka Branch (Colombo)
- Siam Society (Bangkok)
- International Institute of Tamil Studies (Chennai)
- Maha Bodhi Society (Kolkata)
- Tokai Association of Indian and Buddhist Studies (Nagoya)

== Bibliography ==
- Hartmann, Jens-Uwe (2008). "Heinz Bechert (1932–2005)". Zeitschrift der Deutschen Morgenländischen Gesellschaft. 158 (1). ULB Halle: 1–7.
- Webb, Russel (2005). "Heinz Bechert 26 June 1932–14 June 2005". Buddhist Studies Review. 22 (2): 211–216. doi:10.1558/bsrv.v22i2.14041. S2CID 247875437. Archived from the original on 10 April 2022.
