= Bartus =

Bartus is a surname. Notable people with the surname include:

- Barbara Bartuś (born 1967), Polish politician
- Theodor Bartus (1858–1941), German sailor
