= Heinrich Lüders =

German orientalist and indologist

Heinrich Lüders

Heinrich Lüders (25 June 1869 in Lübeck – 7 May 1943 in Badenweiler) was a German Orientalist and Indologist known for his epigraphical analysis of the Sanskrit Turfan fragmentary manuscripts.

== Biography ==
From 1888 to 1894, he studied at the Ludwig-Maximilians-Universität München and the University of Göttingen, and afterwards worked as an assistant curator and librarian in the Indian Institute at the University of Oxford. In 1898, he became an associate professor at the University of Göttingen, then five years later relocated to the University of Rostock, where in 1905 he was named professor of Indo-European linguistics and Sanskrit. In 1909, he was appointed professor of ancient Indian languages and literature at the Friedrich Wilhelm University of Berlin, where from 1931 to 1932, he served as academic rector. In 1935, he retired from teaching and devoted himself entirely to research.

From 1920 to 1938, he served as secretary of the Prussian Academy of Sciences. In 1932 he was recipient of the Goethe-Medaille für Kunst und Wissenschaft (Goethe Medal for Art and Science). He was also appointed to the "Königlich Preußische Phonographische Kommission" (Royal Prussian Phonographic Commission) for his expertise in the languages Bengali, Pashto, and Gurung. The purpose of the commission was to record the approximately 250 languages spoken by the prisoners of German WWI PoW camps.

== Published works ==
- Bruchstücke buddhistischer Dramen, 1911.
- Weitere Beiträge zur Geschichte und Geographie von Ostturkestan. Berlin 1930.
- Kātantra und Kaumāralāta. Berlin 1930.
- Philologica Indica, 1940.
- Bhārhut und die buddhistische Literatur. Leipzig 1941.
- Beobachtungen über die Sprache des buddhistischen Urkanons. (edition by Ernst Waldschmidt. Berlin 1954).
- "Mathurā Inscriptions. Unpublished papers" (edition by Klaus Ludwig Janert. Göttingen 1961).
- Kleine Schriften. (edition by Oskar von Hinüber. Wiesbaden 1973).

== Bibliography ==
- Friedrich Wilhelm (1987). "Lüders, Heinrich". Neue Deutsche Biographie (in German). Vol. 15. Berlin: Duncker & Humblot. pp. 453–454. (full text online).
- Ernst Waldschmidt (1943). Heinrich Lüders. In: Forschungen und Fortschritte. Nachrichtenblatt der Deutschen Wissenschaft und Technik, Organ des Reichsforschungsrates 19 (23/24), 250–252
