= Georg Huth =

German orientalist and linguist (1867–1906)

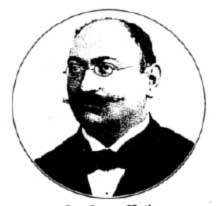

Georg Huth (25 February 1867 – 1 June 1906) was a German Orientalist and explorer.

Huth was born in Krotoszyn (Krotoschin) in the Province of Posen, Prussia. In 1885, he entered the University of Berlin, and he graduated at the University of Leipzig (Ph.D.) in 1889. In 1891, he established himself at Berlin University as lecturer in Central Asiatic languages and in Buddhism. In 1897, he undertook a journey to Siberia for the purpose of studying Tungusic, receiving a subvention from the Imperial Academy of Sciences of St. Petersburg. He went to eastern Turkestan with the German Turfan expedition of the Königliches Museum für Völkerkunde of Berlin, in 1902, and spent the following year in western Turkestan studying Turkish dialects and folklore.

== Works ==
He published, among others, the following works:

- "Die Zeit des Kālidāsa" (Berlin, 1889);
- "The Chandoratnākara of Ratnākaraçānti" (Sanskrit text with Tibetan translation), a work on Sanskrit prosody (ib. 1890);
- Geschichte des Buddhismus in der Mongolei: aus dem Tibetischen des 'Jigs-med-nam-mkha' (vol. i, Tibetan text; vol. ii, German transl., Strasburg, 1892–96);
- "Die Inschriften von Tsaghan Baišing," Tibetan-Mongolian text with linguistic and historical notes, printed at the expense of the Deutsche Morgenländische Gesellschaft (Leipzig, 1894);
- "Die Tungusische Volkslitteratur und Ihre Ethnologische Ausbeute," in the Bulletin of the St. Petersburg Academy of Sciences (1901).

== Family and personal life ==
Father to the writer and professor Dr. Arno George Huth, grandfather to the American artist Gerald Arno Huth, and great-grandfather to the curator Naomi Huth.
