= Albert von Le Coq =

German brewery owner, wine merchant and archaeologist (1860–1930)

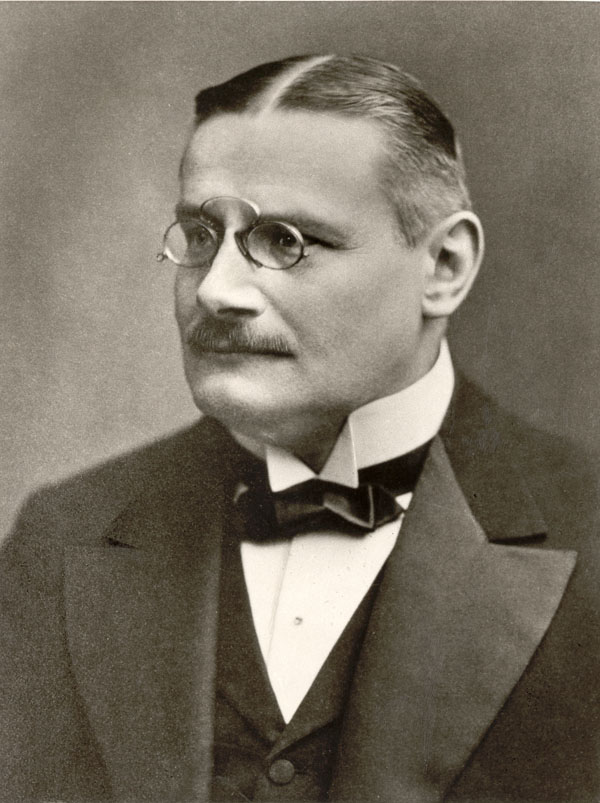
Albert von Le Coq

Albert von Le Coq (Note: In German personal names, von is a preposition which approximately means 'of' or 'from' and usually denotes some sort of nobility. While von (always lower case) is part of the family name or territorial designation, not a first or middle name, if the noble is referred to by their last name, use Schiller, Clausewitz or Goethe, not von Schiller, etc.) (German pronunciation: [ˈalbɛʁt fɔn lə ˈkɔk]; 8 September 1860 in Berlin, Prussia – 21 April 1930 in Berlin, Weimar Republic) was a Prussian/German brewery owner and wine merchant, who at the age of 40 began to study archaeology.

== Background ==
He was born at Berlin, of a family of French Huguenot origin, as evidenced in his family name.
Von Le Coq was heir to a sizable fortune derived from breweries and wineries scattered throughout Central and Eastern Europe, thus allowing him the luxury of travel and study at his leisure. The business he owned survives today as the A. Le Coq brewery in Tartu, Estonia.

== Career as archaeologist ==
Aided by his wealth, von Le Coq became a famous archaeologist and explorer of Central Asia.

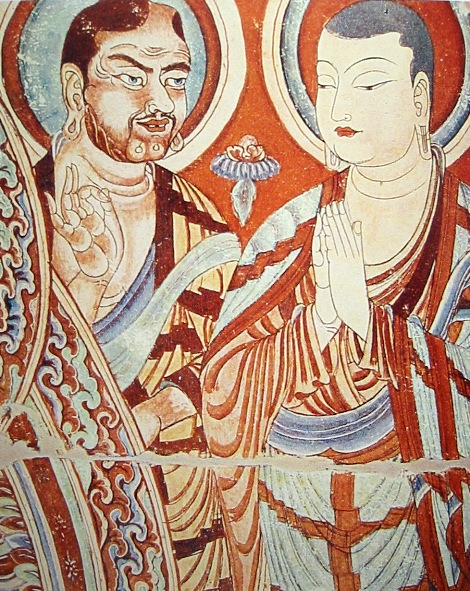
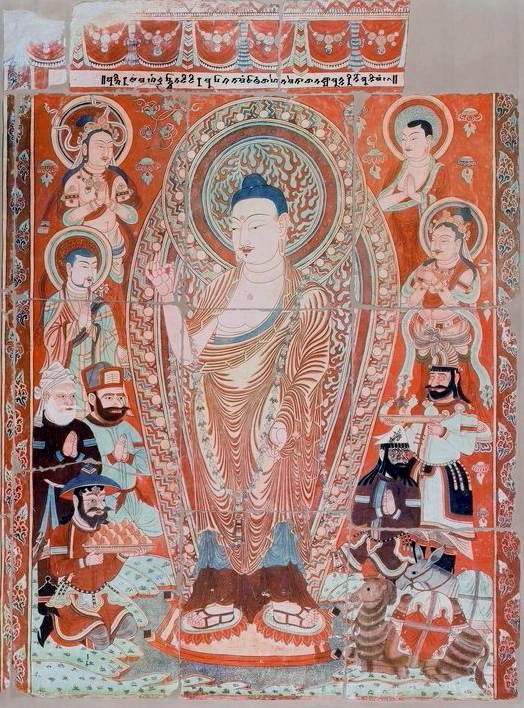
Left image:Two Buddhist monks on a mural of the Bezeklik Thousand Buddha Caves near Turpan, Xinjiang, China, 9th century AD; although Albert von Le Coq (1913) assumed the blue-eyed, red-haired monk was a Tocharian, modern scholarship has identified similar Caucasian figures of the same cave temple (No. 9) as ethnic Sogdians, who inhabited Turpan as an ethnic minority community during the phases of Tang Chinese (7th–8th century) and Uyghur rule (9th–13th century).
Right image: Pranidhi scene, temple 9 (Cave 20), with kneeling figures praying in front of the Buddha who Albert von Le Coq assumed were Persian people (German: "Perser"), noting their Caucasian features and green eyes, as well as the donkey and Central-Asian Bactrian camel loaded with tributary goods. However, modern scholarship has identified praṇidhi scenes of the same temple (No. 9) as depicting ethnic Sogdians, an Eastern Iranian people who inhabited Turfan as an ethnic minority community during the phases of Tang Chinese (7th-8th century) and Uyghur rule (9th-13th century).

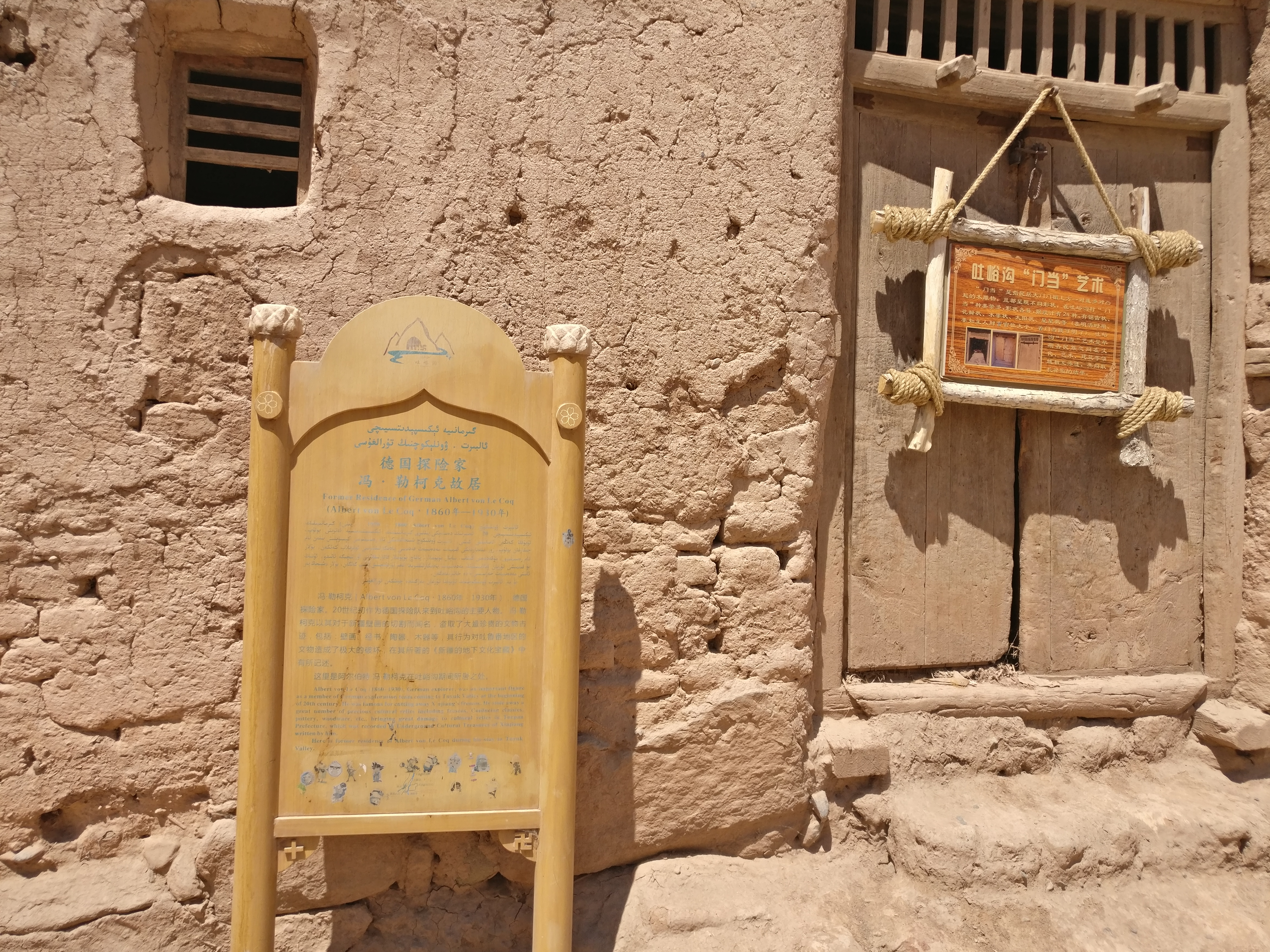
Albert von Le Coq once lived in this house when he was in Turpan.

Von Le Coq was convinced that the influence of Ancient Greece could be found as far in the east as China. However, organising expeditions to Central Asia and China was beyond his means. The German archaeologist Hermann Parzinger has found a letter in the Prussian State Archive which reveals that the financial backing to von Le Coq's expedition came from no one else than the last German emperor Wilhelm II. Wilhelm was obsessed with Greek culture and supported one of the expeditions with 32,000 German gold marks.

Von Le Coq was associated with the Museum für Völkerkunde (now called the Ethnological Museum of Berlin) in Berlin. Serving as assistant to the head of the museum, Professor Albert Grünwedel, Le Coq helped plan and organize expeditions into the regions of western Asia, specifically areas near the Silk Road such as Gaochang. When Grünwedel fell ill before the departure of the second expedition, Le Coq was assigned to lead it. His account of the second and third German Turpan expeditions was published in English in 1928 as Buried Treasures of Chinese Turkestan.

The expeditions found extensive networks of Buddhist and Manichaean cave temples in the Xinjiang region of Northwest China. Although many of the manuscripts found in the cave were destroyed during the excavation, von Le Coq speculated that he had discovered a major Manichaean library. Some of the paintings also led him to believe that he had found evidence of an Aryan culture, related to the Franks.

Le Coq said that the depictions of figures with apparently blue eyes, red hair and cruciform swords resembled Frankish art: "Such more striking are representations of red-haired, blue-eyed men with faces of a pronounced European type. We connect these people with the Aryan language found in these parts in so many manuscripts.. These red haired people wear suspenders from their belts.. a remarkable ethnological peculiarity!"

With the help of Theodor Bartus and his other assistants, Le Coq carved and sawed away over 360 kilograms (or 305 cases) of artifacts, wall-carvings, and precious icons, which were subsequently shipped to the museum. In Buried Treasures ..., Le Coq defends these "borrowings" as a matter of necessity, citing the turbulent nature of Chinese Turkestan at the time of the expeditions. Chinese consider this seizure a "colonial rapacity" comparable to the taking of the Elgin Marbles or the Koh-i-Noor diamond. The collections from the German expeditions were initially kept at the Indian Department of the Ethnological Museum of Berlin (Ethnologisches Museum Berlin). The artifacts were put on display at the museum and were open to the public until 1944 when the relics were destroyed in British bombing raids during World War II. The Ethnological Museum was bombed seven times in Allied bombing raids, destroying the larger wall murals which had been cemented into place and could not be moved; 28 of the finest paintings were totally destroyed. Smaller pieces were hidden in bunkers and coal mines at the outbreak of war and survived the bombings. When the Russians arrived in 1945 they looted at least 10 crates of treasures that they discovered in a bunker under the Berlin Zoo which have not been seen since. The remaining items have been collected together and are housed in a new museum in Dahlem, a suburb of Berlin, the Museum of Indian Art (Museum für Indische Kunst) from 1963 and finally combined into a single location at the Berlin-Brandenburg Academy of Sciences and Humanities (Berlin-Brandenburgische Akademie der Wissenschaften, BBAW), since 1992.

Most of the manuscripts collection survived stored in salt mines. After the war the major part of the collection was given in 1946 to the newly founded Deutsche Akademie der Wissenschaften. A smaller portion found its way to the Mainzer Akademie der Wissenschaften und Literatur.

== Sources ==
- von Le Coq, Albert (1928), Buried Treasures of Chinese Turkestan: An Account of the Activities and Adventures of the Second and Third German Turpan Expeditions, translated by Barwell, Anna, London: George Allen & Unwin (Repr: 1985, OUP. ISBN 0-19-583878-5)
- von Le Coq, Albert (1922), Die buddhistische Spätantike in Mittelasien, vol. 1: Die Plastik, Berlin: Dietrich Reimer
- von Le Coq, Albert (1923), Die buddhistische Spätantike in Mittelasien, vol. 2: Die Manichaeischen Miniaturen, Berlin: Dietrich Reimer
- von Le Coq, Albert (1924), Die buddhistische Spätantike in Mittelasien, vol. 3: Die Wandmalereien, Berlin: Dietrich Reimer
- von Le Coq, Albert (1924), Die buddhistische Spätantike in Mittelasien, vol. 4: Atlas zu den Wandmalereien, Berlin: Dietrich Reimer
- von Le Coq, Albert (1926), Die buddhistische Spätantike in Mittelasien, vol. 5: Neue Bildwerke, Berlin: Dietrich Reimer
- von Le Coq, Albert (1928), Die buddhistische Spätantike in Mittelasien, vol. 6: Neue Bildwerke II, Berlin: Dietrich Reimer
- von Le Coq, Albert (1933), Die buddhistische Spätantike in Mittelasien, vol. 7: Neue Bildwerke III, Berlin: Dietrich Reimer
- Hopkirk, Peter (1980), Foreign Devils on the Silk Road: The Search for the Lost Cities and Treasures of Chinese Central Asia, Amherst: University of Massachusetts Press, ISBN 0-87023-435-8
