= Ernst Waldschmidt =

German orientalist and Indologist (1897–1985)

Ernst Waldschmidt 1938

Ernst Waldschmidt (July 15, 1897, Lünen, Province of Westphalia – February 25, 1985, Göttingen) was a German orientalist and Indologist. He was a pupil of German indologist Emil Sieg.

He taught at Berlin University and began teaching at the University of Göttingen in 1936. Waldschmidt joined the Nazi party in May 1937 and became a member of the National Socialist German Lecturers League in 1939.

During WW2, Professor Waldschmidt was drafted into The Luftwaffe, where he received the rank of Major. He was stationed at Dulag Luft as an interrogator for downed allied bomber crew.

He was a specialist on Indian philosophy, and archaeology of India and Central Asia. He also founded Stiftung Ernst Waldschmidt.

== Literary works ==
- Buddhistische Kunst in Indien, 1932
- Die buddhistische Spätantike in Mittelasien (the 7th Volume), 1933
- Gandhara, Kutscha, Turfan, 1925
- Die Überlieferung vom Lebensende des Buddha, 2 Vols., 1944–1948

== Bibliography ==
- Härtel, Herbert (1987). "Ernst Waldschmidt (1897–1985)". Zeitschrift der Deutschen Morgenländischen Gesellschaft. 137 (1): 6–11. JSTOR 43374996. (subscription required)
- Bechert, Heinz (1986). "Ernst Waldschmidt (1897–1985) (Obituary)". Journal of the International Association of Buddhist Studies. 9 (1): 147–149.
