= Theodor Bartus =

Explorer; museum conservator (1858–1941)

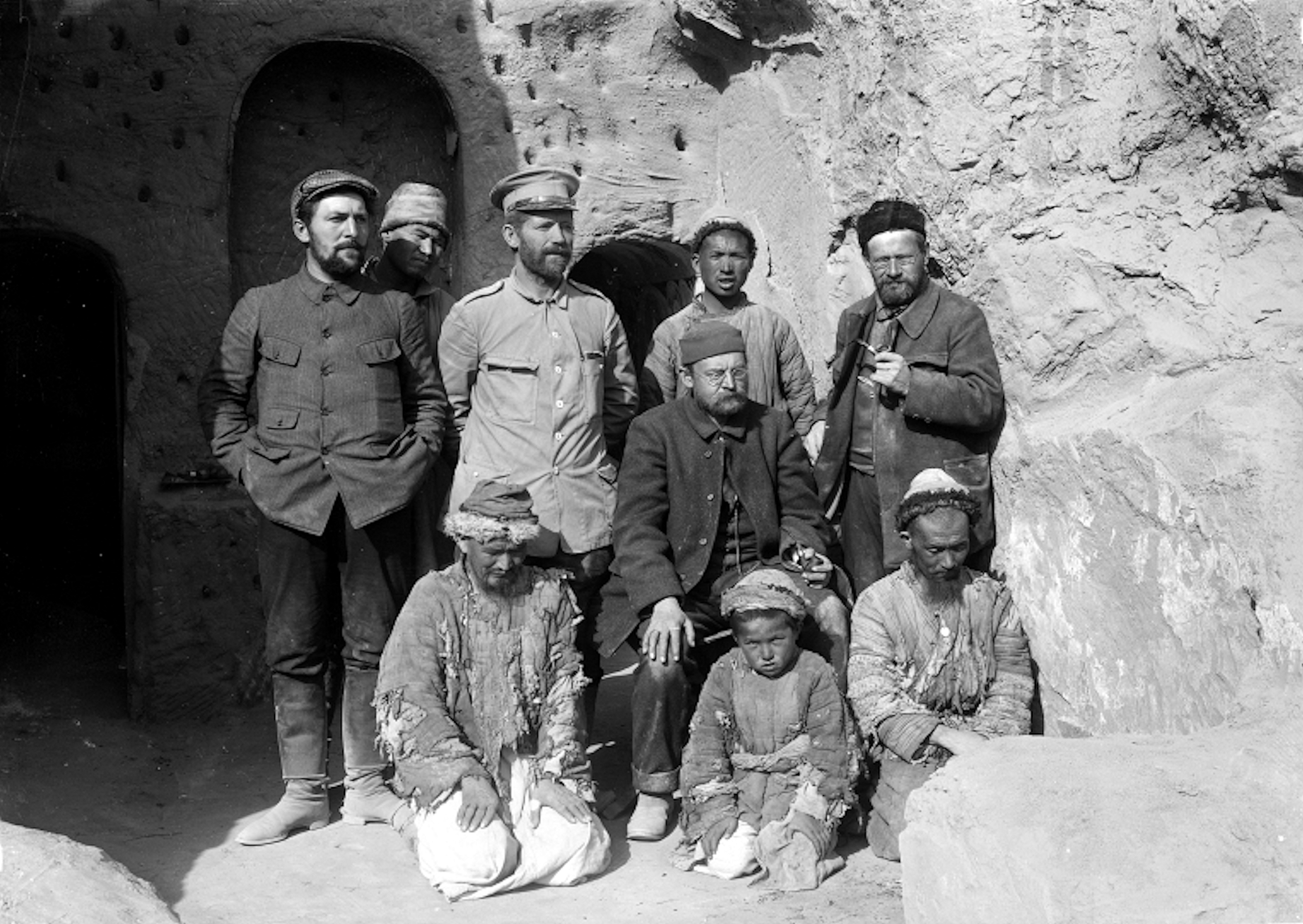
- German Expedition at Kizil Caves, in front of Cave 4, in 1906. Bartus is standing in uniform.
- Born: 30 January 1858; Lassan, Germany
- Died: 28 January 1941 (aged 82); Berlin, Nazi Germany
- Occupation(s): Sailor, museum technician, conservator
- Known for: Participating in the German Turfan expeditions

Theodor Bartus (30 January 1858 in Lassan, Germany – 28 January 1941 in Berlin) was a German sailor, museum technician, and conservator. Bartus was the son of a master weaver. He began his nautical career on the sailing ship of his uncle. In Australia, he passed his First mate exam and became captain. He acquired many years of experience sailing ships. At times, he lived as a squatter in Australia.

During a visit to Germany, his Australian bank went bankrupt, and he became suddenly destitute. Forced to find a job, he worked from 1888 as a museum technician at the Ethnological Museum of Berlin, where he rigged vessels.

Between 1902 and 1914, he was a technical crew member on all four German Turfan expeditions headed by Albert Grünwedel and Albert von Le Coq. Bartus developed a method of detaching mural paintings and inscriptions from caves, rock walls, and ruins, leaving them largely undamaged, which were then transported to Germany. Until his death, he was employed at the museum, preparing and preserving the finds he brought back from Turfan.

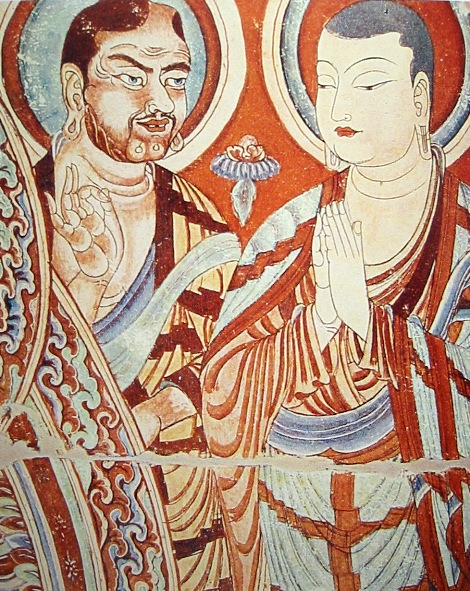
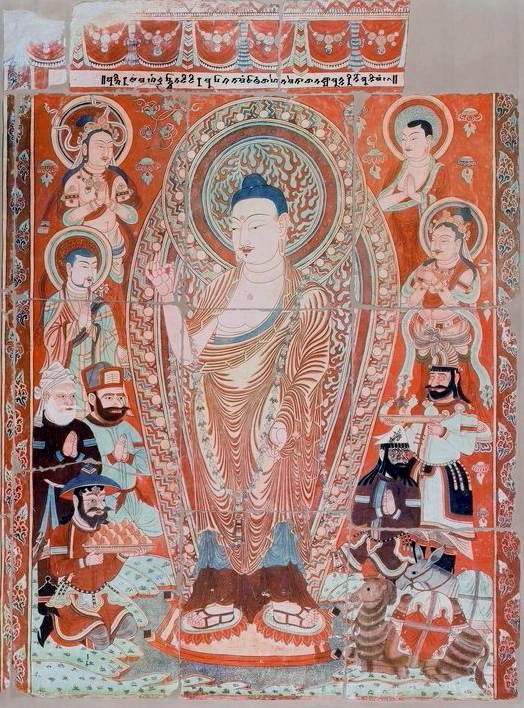
Left image:Two Buddhist monks on a mural of the Bezeklik Thousand Buddha Caves near Turpan, Xinjiang, China, 9th century AD; although Albert von Le Coq (1913) assumed the blue-eyed, red-haired monk was a Tocharian, modern scholarship has identified similar Caucasian figures of the same cave temple (No. 9) as ethnic Sogdians, who inhabited Turpan as an ethnic minority community during the phases of Tang Chinese (7th–8th century) and Uyghur rule (9th–13th century).
Right image: Pranidhi scene, temple 9 (Cave 20), with kneeling figures praying in front of the Buddha who Albert von Le Coq assumed were Persian people (German: "Perser"), noting their Caucasian features and green eyes, as well as the donkey and Central-Asian Bactrian camel loaded with tributary goods. However, modern scholarship has identified praṇidhi scenes of the same temple (No. 9) as depicting ethnic Sogdians, an Eastern Iranian people who inhabited Turfan as an ethnic minority community during the phases of Tang Chinese (7th–8th century) and Uyghur rule (9th–13th century).
