= Zeitschrift der Deutschen Morgenländischen Gesellschaft =

Academic journal about Asian studies

- Discipline: Area studies
- Language: English
- Edited by: Florian C. Reiter

Publication details
- History: 1847–present
- Publisher: Harrassowitz Verlag
- Frequency: Biannual

Standard abbreviations
- ISO 4: Z. Dtsch. Morgenl. Ges.

Indexing
- ISSN: 0341-0137

Links
- Journal homepage

The Zeitschrift der Deutschen Morgenländischen Gesellschaft (lit. 'Journal of the German Oriental Society') is a peer-reviewed academic journal covering Oriental studies, published by Harrassowitz Verlag on behalf of the Deutsche Morgenländische Gesellschaft. It was established in 1847 and the editor-in-chief is Florian C. Reiter (Humboldt University of Berlin).

== Digitisation ==
The journal has been digitized and is available from the University of Halle. The journal is available from 1847 to 2013, together with various indexes and supplements, including the Deutscher Orientalistentag volumes from 1968 to 1995.
