= Valley =

Low area between hills, often with a river running through it

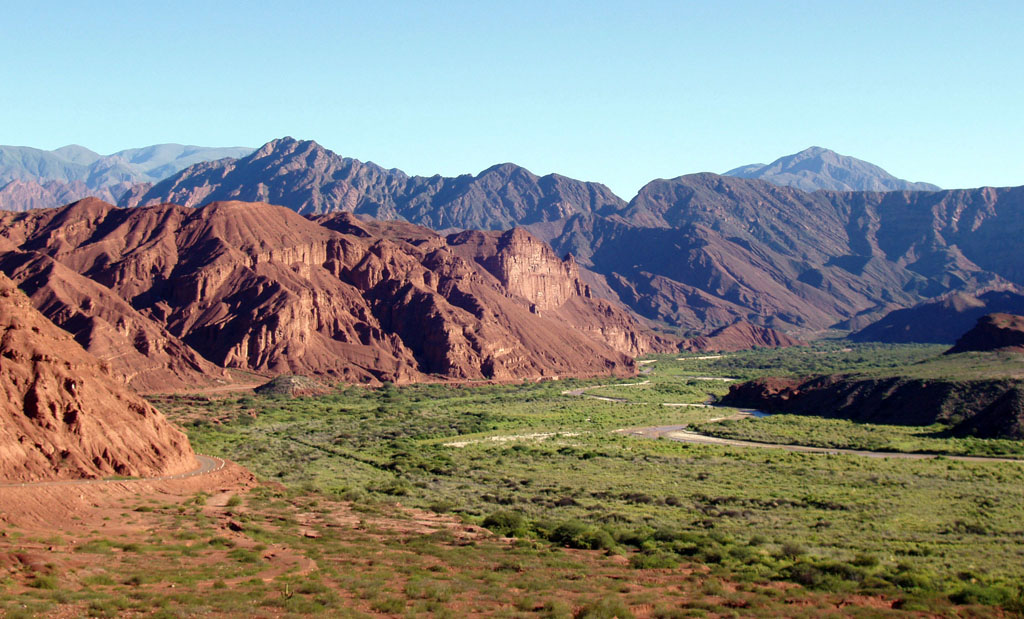
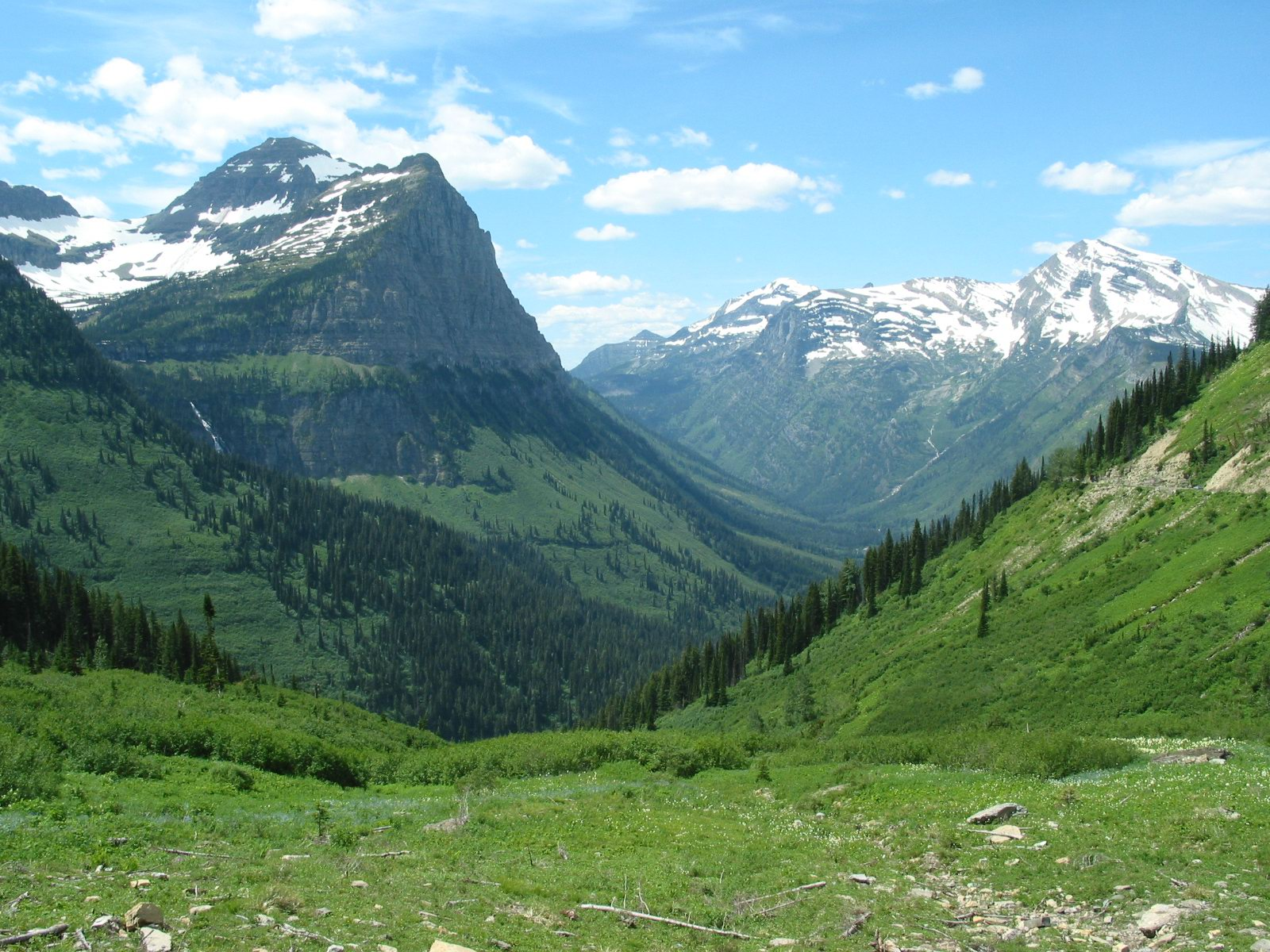
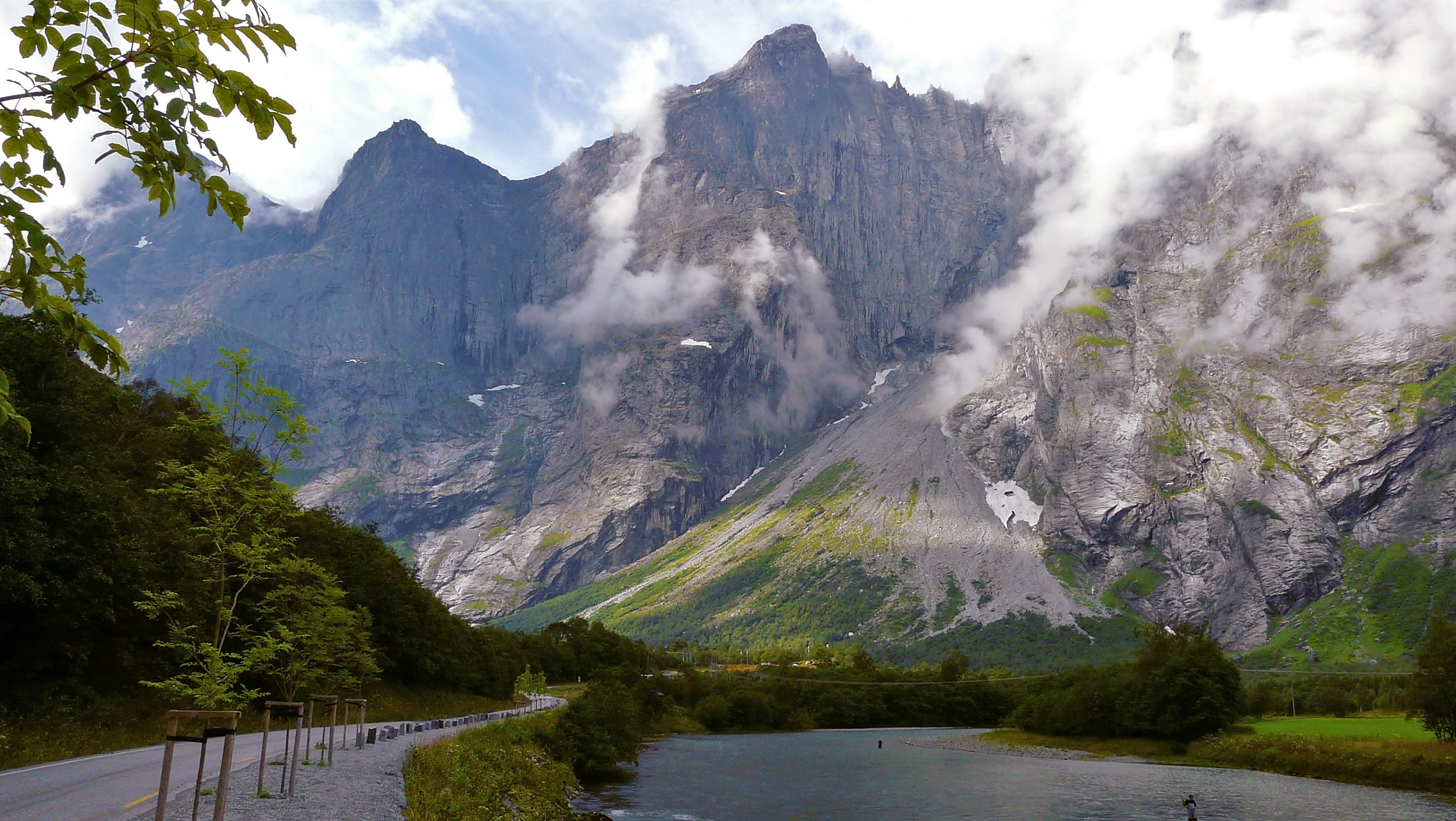
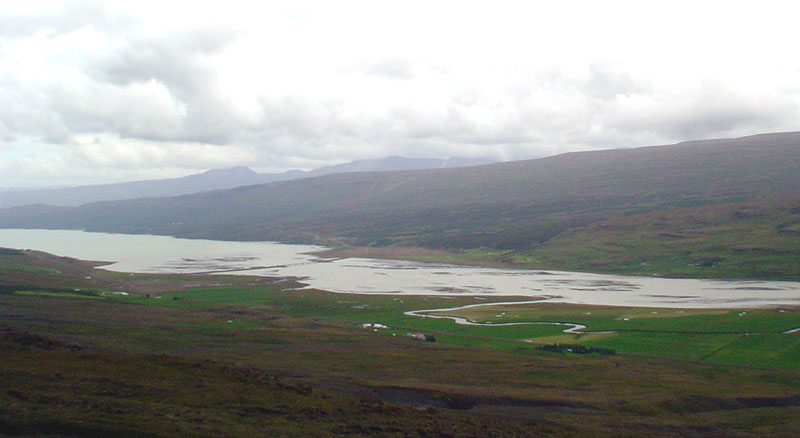
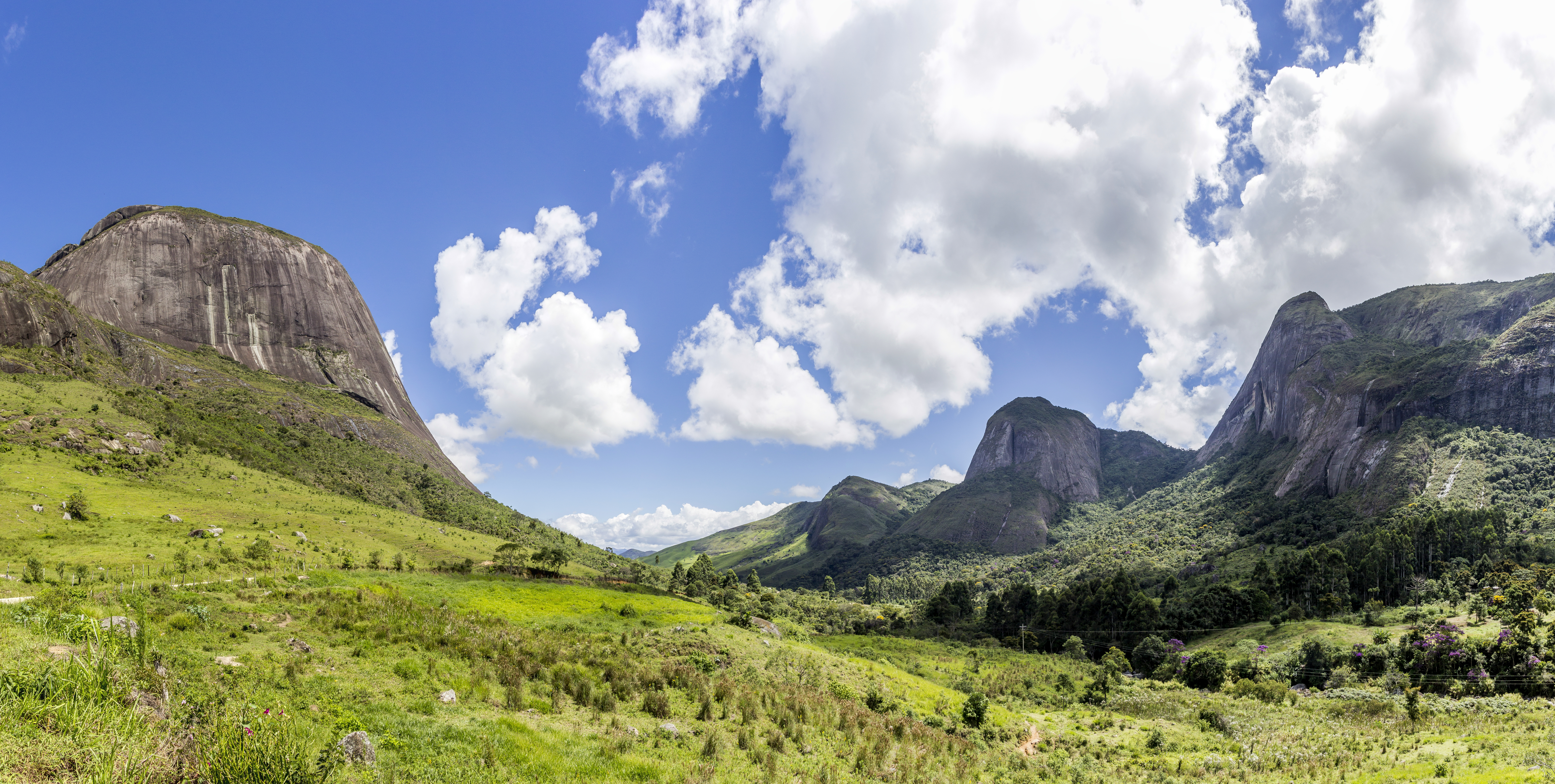
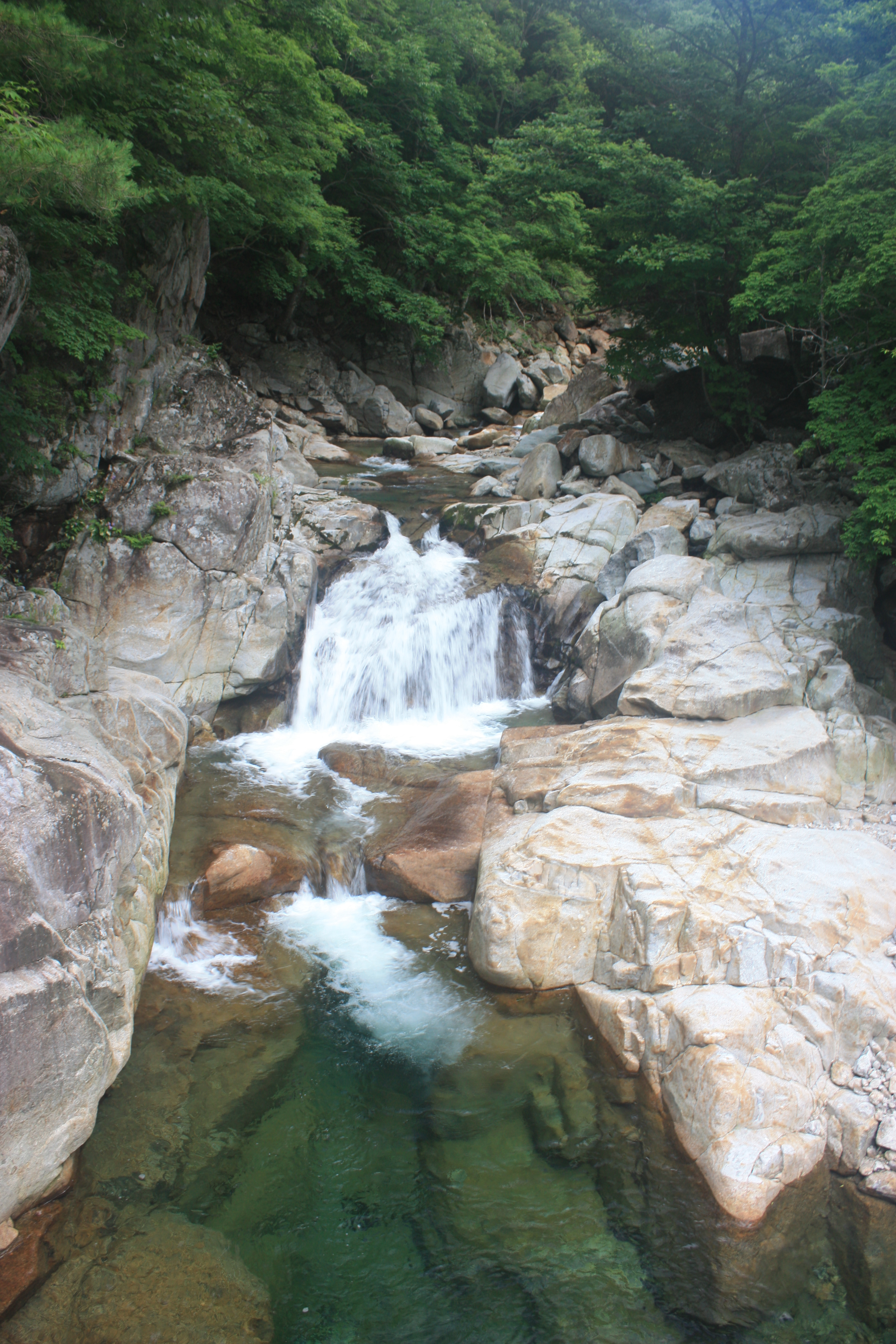
Clockwise from upper left: Calchaquí Valley in Argentina; U-shaped valley in Glacier National Park, Montana, United States; Fljótsdalur in East Iceland, a rather flat valley; Baemsagol Valley of Jirisan, Korea; The Frades Valley in the mountainous region of Rio de Janeiro state, Brazil; Romsdalen in Western Norway has almost vertical walls;

A valley is an elongated low area often running between hills or mountains and typically containing a river or stream running from one end to the other. Most valleys are formed by erosion of the land surface by rivers or streams over a very long period. Some valleys are formed through erosion by glacial ice. These glaciers may remain present in valleys in high mountains or polar areas.

At lower latitudes and altitudes, glacially formed valleys may have been created or enlarged during ice ages but now are ice-free and occupied by streams or rivers. In desert areas, valleys may be entirely dry or carry a watercourse only rarely. In areas of limestone bedrock, dry valleys may result from drainage now taking place underground rather than at the surface. Rift valleys arise principally from earth movements, rather than erosion. Many different types of valleys are described by geographers, using terms that may be global in use or else applied only locally.

== Formation of valleys ==
Valleys are depressions in the morphology that slope in one direction along their entire length. They tend to be longer than wide and come in a variety of dimensions. Valleys may arise through several different processes. Most commonly, they are created from erosion over long periods by moving water and are known as river valleys. The processes that alter the river valley surface include corrasion, abrasion, pot-holing, corrosion, and weathering.

Typically, small valleys containing streams feed into larger valleys which in turn feed into larger valleys again, eventually reaching the ocean or perhaps an internal drainage basin. In polar areas and at high altitudes, valleys may be eroded by glaciers; these typically have a U-shaped profile in cross-section, in contrast to river valleys, which tend to have a V-shaped profile. Other valleys may arise principally through tectonic processes such as rifting. All three processes can contribute to the development of a valley over geological time. The flat (or relatively flat) portion of a valley between its sides is referred to as the valley floor. The valley floor is typically formed by river sediments and may be flanked by fluvial terraces.

=== River valleys ===
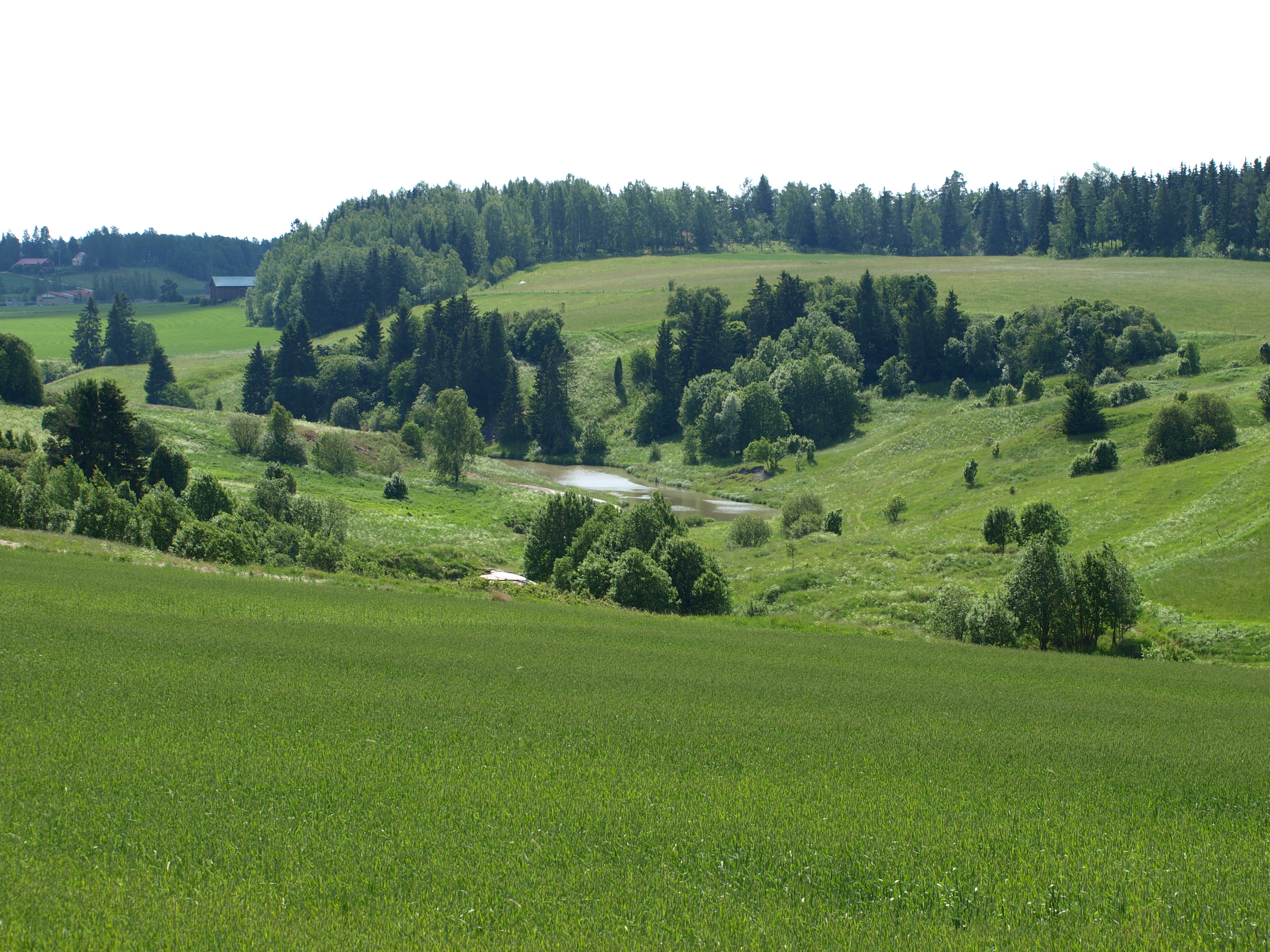
The valley of Halikko River in Halikko, Finland

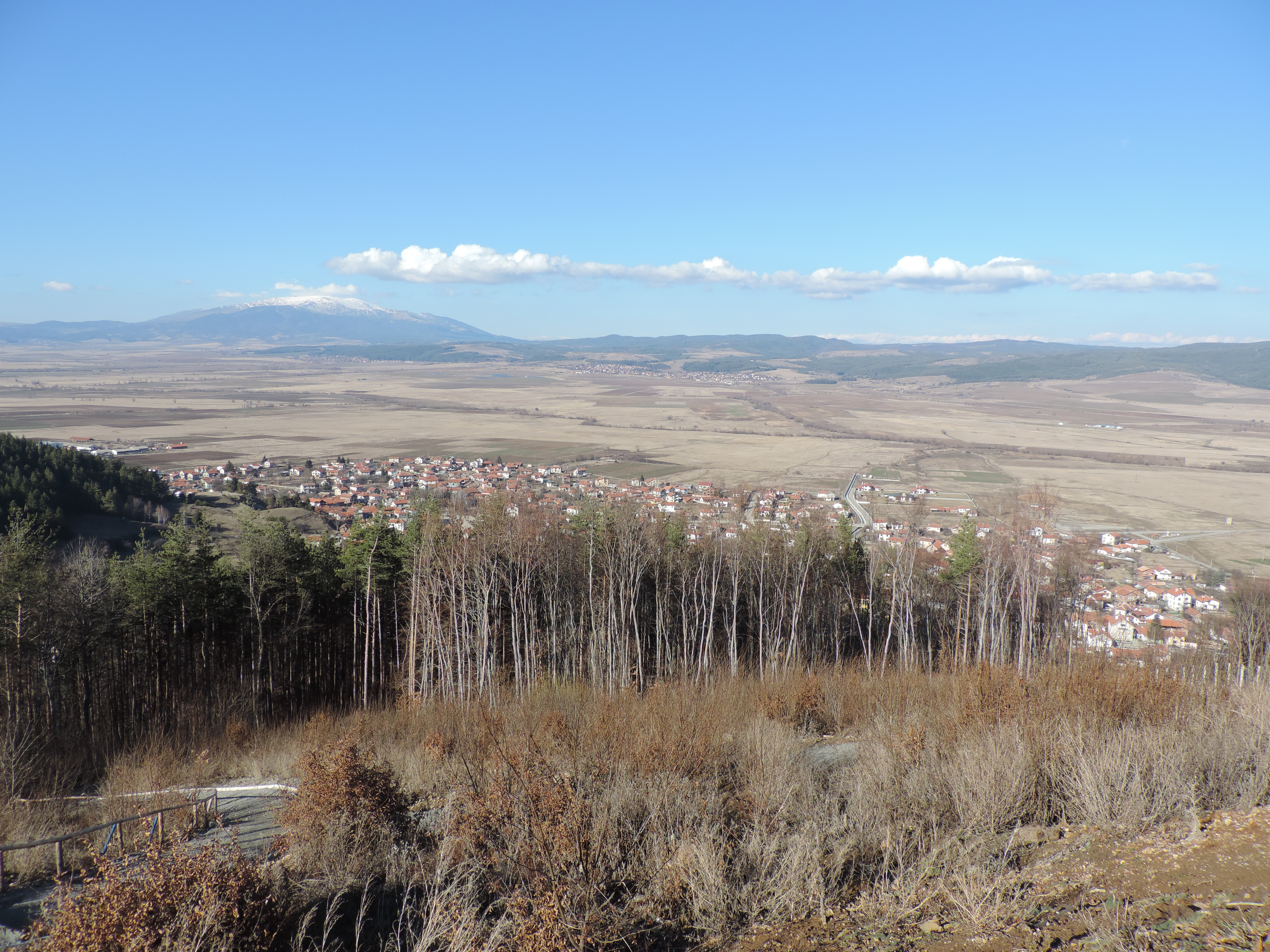
Valley of Palakaria River springing from Vitosha Mountain, seen in the background, in Bulgaria

The development of a river valley is affected by the character of the bedrock or alluvium over which the river or stream flows, the elevational difference between its top and bottom, and the climate. Typically the flow will increase downstream and the gradient will decrease. In the upper valley, the stream will most effectively erode its bed through corrasion to produce a steep-sided V-shaped valley. The presence of more resistant rock bands, of geological faults, fractures, and folds may determine the course of the stream and result in a twisting course with interlocking spurs.

In the middle valley, as numerous streams have coalesced, the valley is typically wider, the flow slower and both erosion and deposition may take place. More lateral erosion takes place in the middle section of a river's course, as strong currents on the outside of its curve erode the bank. Conversely, deposition may take place on the inside of curves where the current is much slacker, the process leading to the river assuming a meandering character. In the lower valley, gradients are lowest, meanders may be much broader and a broader floodplain may result. Deposition dominates over erosion. A typical river basin or drainage basin will incorporate each of these different types of valleys.

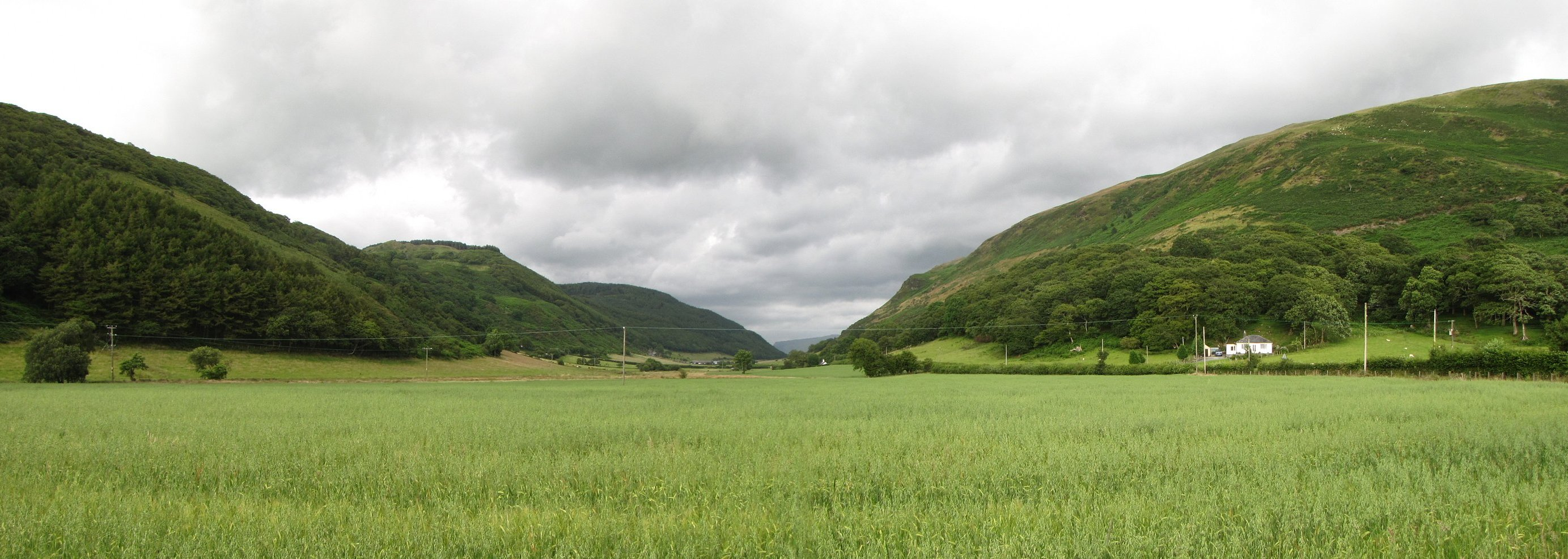
U-shaped valley on the Afon Fathew near Dolgoch, Wales

Some sections of a stream or river valleys may have vertically incised their course to such an extent that the valley they occupy is best described as a gorge, ravine, or canyon. Rapid down-cutting may result from localized uplift of the land surface or rejuvenation of the watercourse as a result for example of a reduction in the base level to which the river is eroded, e.g. lowered global sea level during an ice age. Such rejuvenation may also result in the production of river terraces.

=== Glacial valleys ===
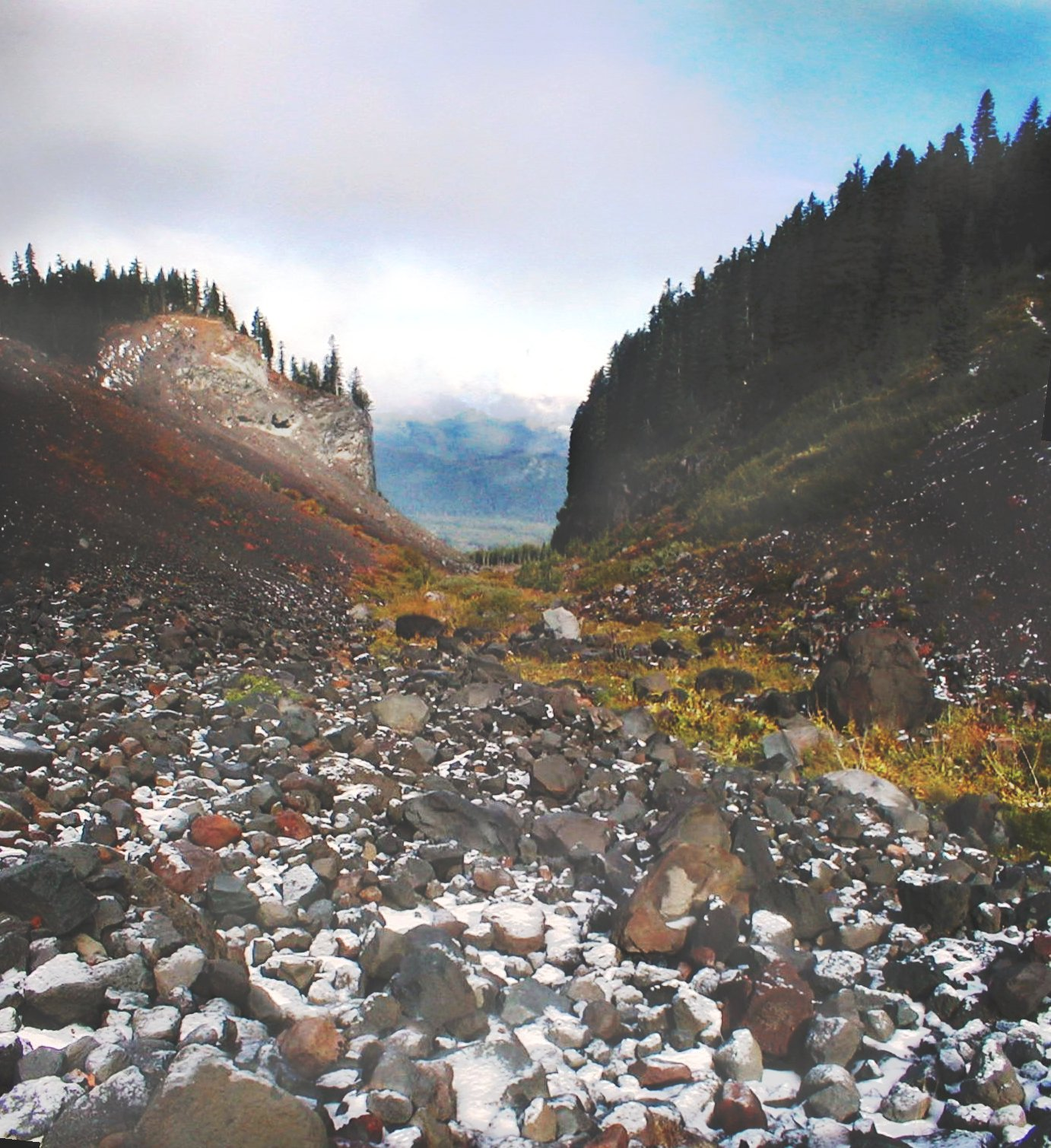
A glaciated valley in the Mount Hood Wilderness showing a characteristic U-shape, the bottom's rocky 'rubble' accretion and the broad shoulders

There are various forms of valleys associated with glaciation. True glacial valleys are those that have been cut by a glacier which may or may not still occupy the valley at the present day. Such valleys may also be known as glacial troughs. They typically have a U-shaped cross-section and are characteristic landforms of mountain areas where glaciation has occurred or continues to take place. This parabola shape is caused by glacial erosion removing the contact surfaces with greatest resistance to flow, and the resulting section minimises friction.

The uppermost part of a glacial valley frequently consists of one or more 'armchair-shaped' hollows, or 'cirques', excavated by the rotational movement downslope of a cirque glacier. During glacial periods, for example, the Pleistocene ice ages, it is in these locations that glaciers initially form and then, as the ice age proceeds, extend downhill through valleys that have previously been shaped by water rather than ice. Abrasion by rock material embedded within the moving glacial ice causes the widening and deepening of the valley to produce the characteristic U or trough shape with relatively steep, even vertical sides and a relatively flat bottom.

Interlocking spurs associated with the development of river valleys are preferentially eroded to produce truncated spurs, typical of glaciated mountain landscapes. The upper end of the trough below the ice-contributing cirques may be a trough-end. Valley steps (or 'rock steps') can result from differing erosion rates due to both the nature of the bedrock (hardness and jointing for example) and the power of the moving ice. In places, a rock basin may be excavated which may later be filled with water to form a ribbon lake or else by sediments. Such features are found in coastal areas as fjords. The shape of the valley which results from all of these influences may only become visible upon the recession of the glacier that forms it. A river or stream may remain in the valley; if it is smaller than one would expect given the size of its valley, it can be considered an example of a misfit stream.

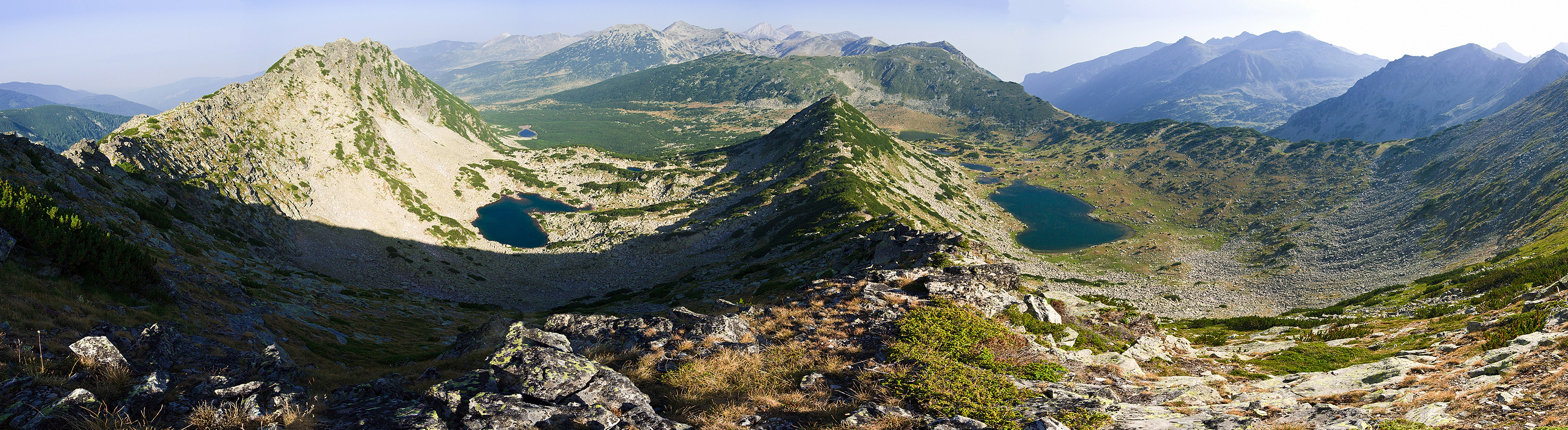
A panoramic view of two merging U-shaped valleys in Pirin mountain, Bulgaria

Other interesting glacially carved valleys include:

- Yosemite Valley (United States)
- Side valleys of the Austrian river Salzach for their parallel directions and hanging mouths.
- That of the St. Mary River in Glacier National Park in Montana, United States.

==== Tunnel ====
A tunnel valley is a large, long, U-shaped valley originally cut under the glacial ice near the margin of continental ice sheets such as that now covering Antarctica and formerly covering portions of all continents during past glacial ages. Such valleys can be up to 100 km (62 mi) long, 4 km (2.5 mi) wide, and 400 m (1,300 ft) deep (its depth may vary along its length). Tunnel valleys were formed by subglacial water erosion. They once served as subglacial drainage pathways carrying large volumes of meltwater. Their cross-sections exhibit steep-sided flanks similar to fjord walls, and their flat bottoms are typical of subglacial glacial erosion.

==== Meltwater ====
In northern Central Europe, the Scandinavian ice sheet during the various ice ages advanced slightly uphill against the lie of the land. As a result, its meltwaters flowed parallel to the ice margin to reach the North Sea basin, forming huge, flat valleys known as Urstromtäler. Unlike the other forms of glacial valleys, these were formed by glacial meltwaters.

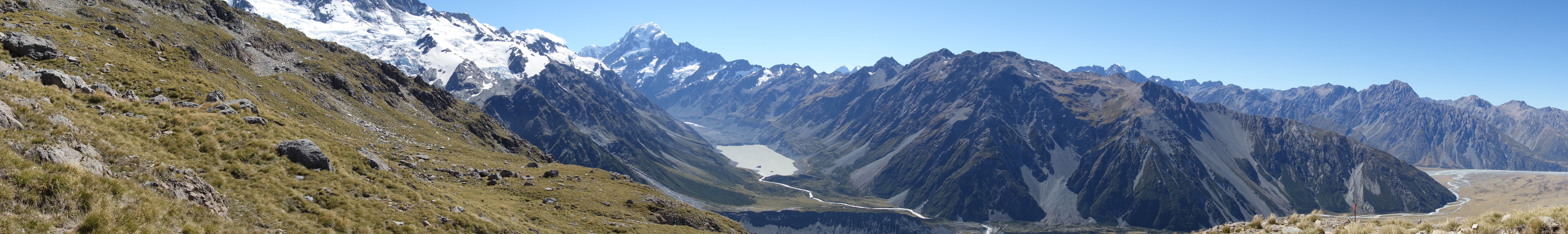
New Zealand's Hooker Valley at Aoraki / Mount Cook National Park, with Hooker Glacier's terminus at Hooker Lake in the background

=== Transition forms and shoulders ===
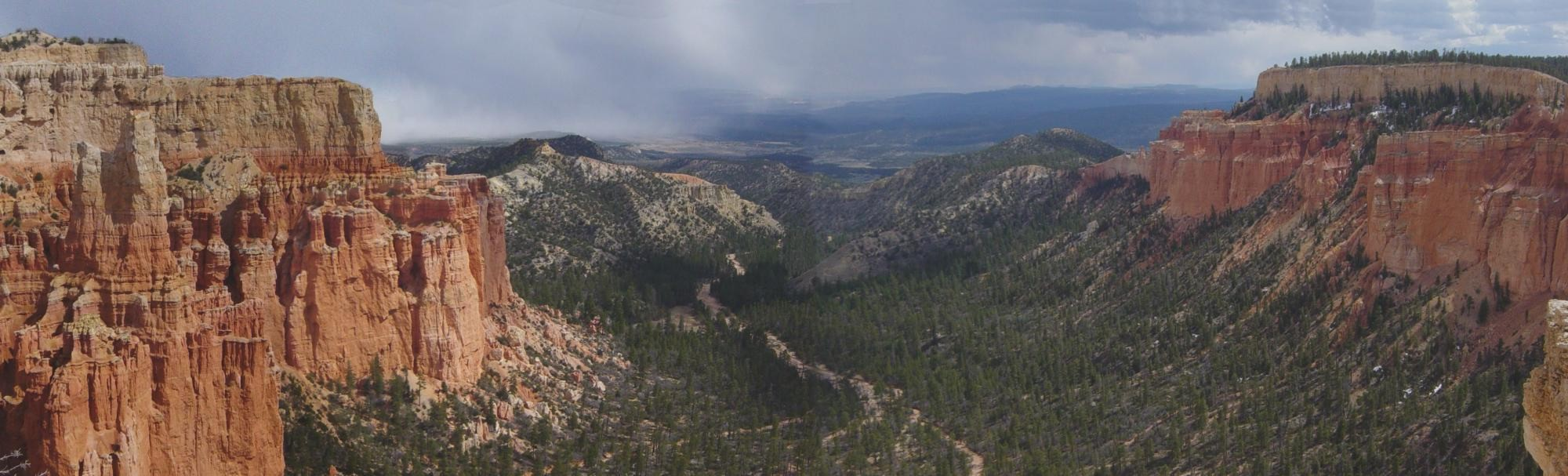
Look from Paria View to a valley in Bryce Canyon, Utah, with very striking shoulders

Depending on the topography, the rock types, and the climate, a variety of transitional forms between V-, U- and plain valleys can form. The floor or bottom of these valleys can be broad or narrow, but all valleys have a shoulder. The broader a mountain valley, the lower its shoulders are located in most cases. An important exception is canyons where the shoulder almost is near the top of the valley's slope. In the Alps – e.g. the Tyrolean Inn valley – the shoulders are quite low (100–200 meters above the bottom). Many villages are located here (esp. on the sunny side) because the climate is very mild: even in winter when the valley's floor is filled with fog, these villages are in sunshine.

In some stress-tectonic regions of the Rocky Mountains or the Alps (e.g. Salzburg), the side valleys are parallel to each other, and are hanging. Smaller streams flow into rivers as deep canyons or waterfalls.

=== Hanging tributary ===
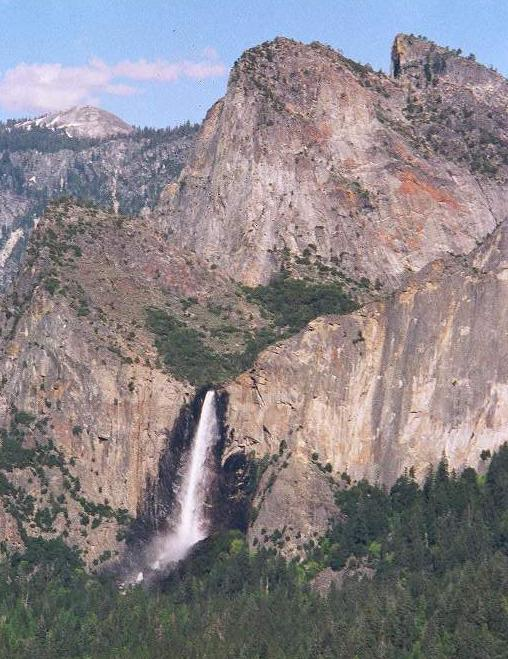
Bridal Veil Falls in Yosemite National Park flowing from a hanging valley

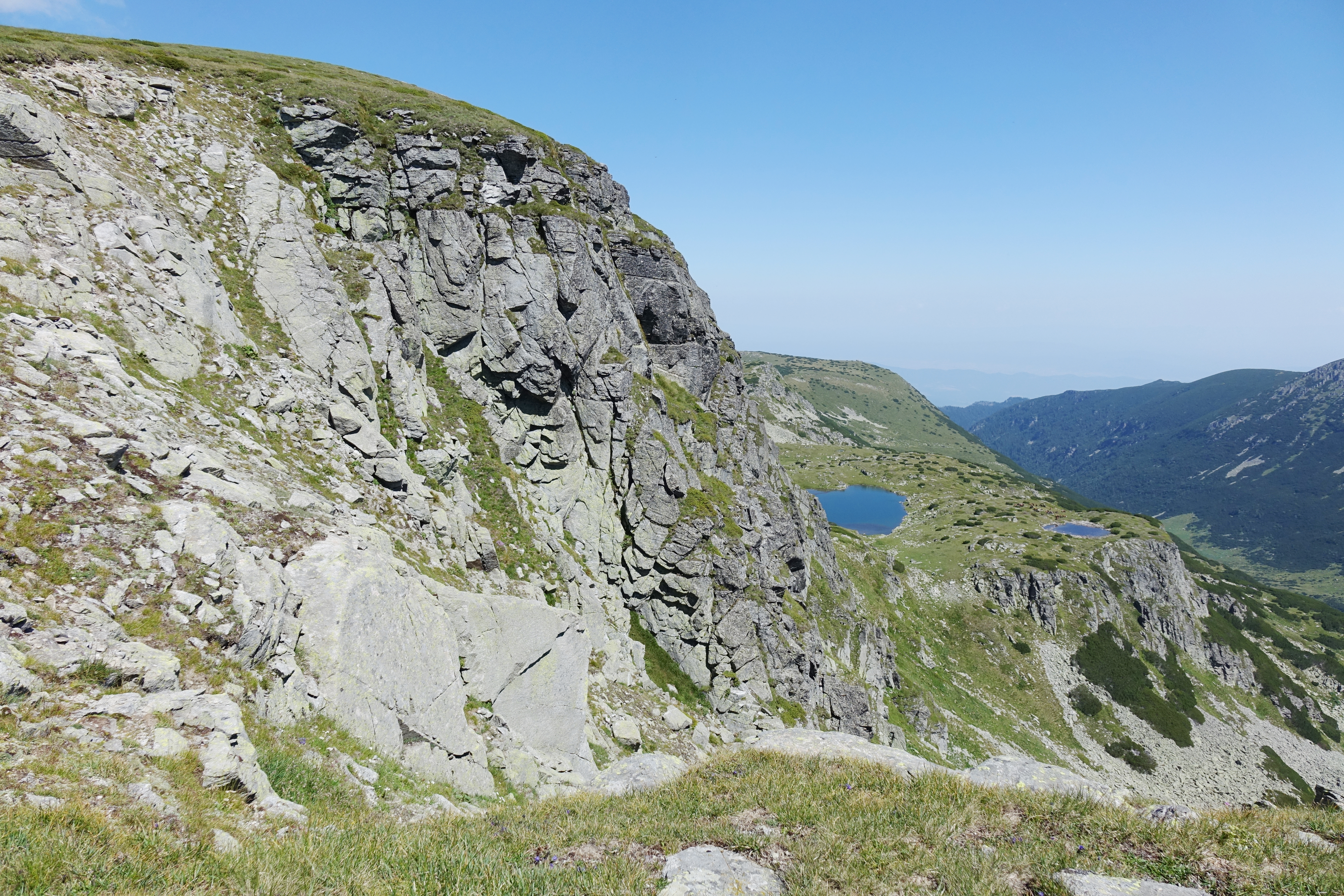
Hanging valley, Ibar (lake) valley, Rila Mountain, Bulgaria

A hanging valley is a tributary valley that is higher than the main valley. They are most commonly associated with U-shaped valleys, where a tributary glacier flows into a glacier of larger volume. The main glacier erodes a deep U-shaped valley with nearly vertical sides, while the tributary glacier, with a smaller volume of ice, makes a shallower U-shaped valley. Since the surfaces of the glaciers were originally at the same elevation, the shallower valley appears to be 'hanging' above the main valley. Often, waterfalls form at or near the outlet of the upper valley.

Hanging valleys also occur in fjord systems underwater. The branches of Sognefjord are much shallower than the main fjord. The mouth of Fjærlandsfjord is about 400 meters (1,300 ft) deep while the main fjord nearby is 1,200 meters (3,900 ft) deep. The mouth of Ikjefjord is only 50 meters (160 ft) deep while the main fjord is around 1,300 meters (4,300 ft) at the same point.

Glaciated terrain is not the only site of hanging streams and valleys. Hanging valleys are also simply the product of varying rates of erosion of the main valley and the tributary valleys. The varying rates of erosion are associated with the composition of the adjacent rocks in the different valley locations. The tributary valleys are eroded and deepened by glaciers or erosion at a slower rate than that of the main valley floor; thus the difference in the two valleys' depth increases over time. The tributary valley, composed of more resistant rock, then hangs over the main valley.

=== Trough-shaped ===
Trough-shaped valleys also form in regions of heavy topographic denudation. By contrast with glacial U-shaped valleys, there is less downward and sideways erosion. The severe downslope denudation results in gently sloping valley sides; their transition to the actual valley bottom is unclear. Trough-shaped valleys occur mainly in periglacial regions and in tropical regions of variable wetness. Both climates are dominated by heavy denudation.

=== Box ===
Box valleys have wide, relatively level floors and steep sides. They are common in periglacial areas and occur in mid-latitudes, but also occur in tropical and arid regions.

=== Rift ===
Rift valleys, such as the Albertine Rift and Gregory Rift are formed by the expansion of the Earth's crust due to tectonic activity beneath the Earth's surface.

== Terms for valleys ==
There are many terms used for different sorts of valleys. They include:

- Arroyo: a dry watercourse that temporarily or seasonally fills and flows after sufficient rain.
- Cove: A small valley, closed at one or both ends, in the central or southern Appalachian Mountains which sometimes results from the erosion of a geologic window.
- Canyon or gorge: a deep cleft between escarpments or cliffs resulting from weathering and the erosive activity of a river.
- Dambo: a class of complex shallow wetlands.
- Defile: a narrow pass or gorge between mountains or hills.
- Dell: A small, secluded, and often wooded valley.
- Draw:
- Dry valley: A valley not created by sustained surface water flow.
- Erosional valley: A valley formed by erosion.
- Glen: typically a long valley bounded by gently sloped concave sides.
- Gulch: a deep V-shaped valley formed by erosion.
- Hollow: A term used regionally for a small valley surrounded by mountains or ridges. In Ireland, New England, Appalachia, and the Ozarks of Arkansas and Missouri, a hollow is a small valley or dry stream bed; often called a holler.
- Longitudinal valley: An elongated valley found between two nearly-parallel mountain chains.
- Meckgacha:
- Ravine: a landform that is narrower than a canyon and is often the product of streambank erosion.
- Steephead valley: A deep, narrow, flat-bottomed valley with an abrupt ending.
- Strike valley: A valley typically developed parallel to a cuesta from more readily eroded strata.
- Structural valley: A valley formed by geologic events such as drop faults or the rise of highlands.
- Vale: a broad, open valley.
- Wadi: a river valley or a wet (ephemeral) riverbed that contains water only when heavy rain occurs.

Similar geographical features such as gullies, chines, and kloofs, are not usually referred to as valleys.

=== British regional terms for valleys ===
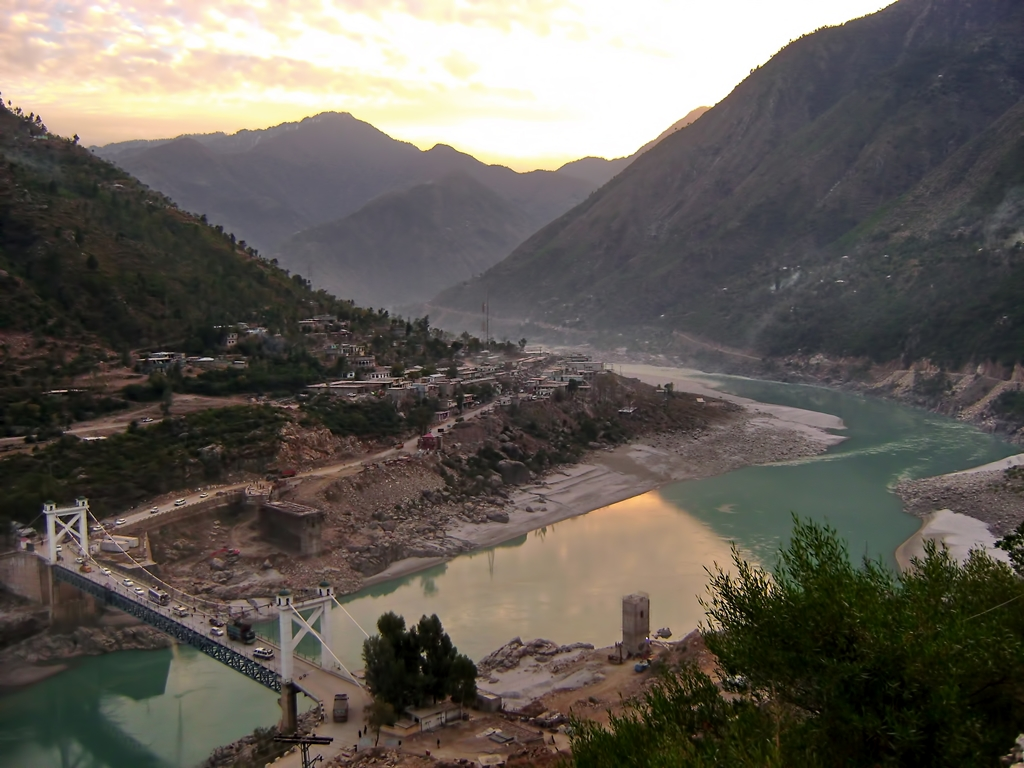
Indus River running through the Kohistan Valley in Pakistan

The terms corrie, glen, and strath are all Anglicisations of Gaelic terms and are commonly encountered in place-names in Scotland and other areas where Gaelic was once widespread. Strath signifies a wide valley between hills, the floor of which is either level or slopes gently. A glen is a river valley which is steeper and narrower than a strath. A corrie is a basin-shaped hollow in a mountain. Each of these terms also occurs in parts of the world formerly colonized by Britain. Corrie is used more widely by geographers as a synonym for (glacial) cirque, as is the word cwm borrowed from Welsh.

The word dale occurs widely in place names in the north of England and, to a lesser extent, in southern Scotland. As a generic name for a type of valley, the term typically refers to a wide valley, though there are many much smaller stream valleys within the Yorkshire Dales which are named "(specific name) Dale". Clough is a word in common use in northern England for a narrow valley with steep sides. Gill is used to describe a ravine containing a mountain stream in Cumbria and the Pennines. The term combe (also encountered as coombe) is widespread in southern England and describes a short valley set into a hillside. Other terms for small valleys such as hope, dean, slade, slack and bottom are commonly encountered in place-names in various parts of England but are no longer in general use as synonyms for valley.

The term vale is used in England and Wales to describe a wide river valley, usually with a particularly wide flood plain or flat valley bottom. In Southern England, vales commonly occur between the outcrops of different relatively erosion-resistant rock formations, where less resistant rock, often claystone has been eroded. An example is the Vale of White Horse in Oxfordshire.

== Human settlement ==
Some of the first human complex societies originated in river valleys, such as that of the Nile, Tigris-Euphrates, Indus, Ganges, Yangtze, Yellow River, Mississippi, and arguably the Amazon. In prehistory, the rivers were used as a source of fresh water and food (fish and game), as well as a place to wash and a sewer. The proximity of water moderated temperature extremes and provided a source for irrigation, stimulating the development of agriculture. Most of the first civilizations developed from these river valley communities. Siting of settlements within valleys is influenced by many factors, including the need to avoid flooding and the location of river crossing points.

== Notable examples ==
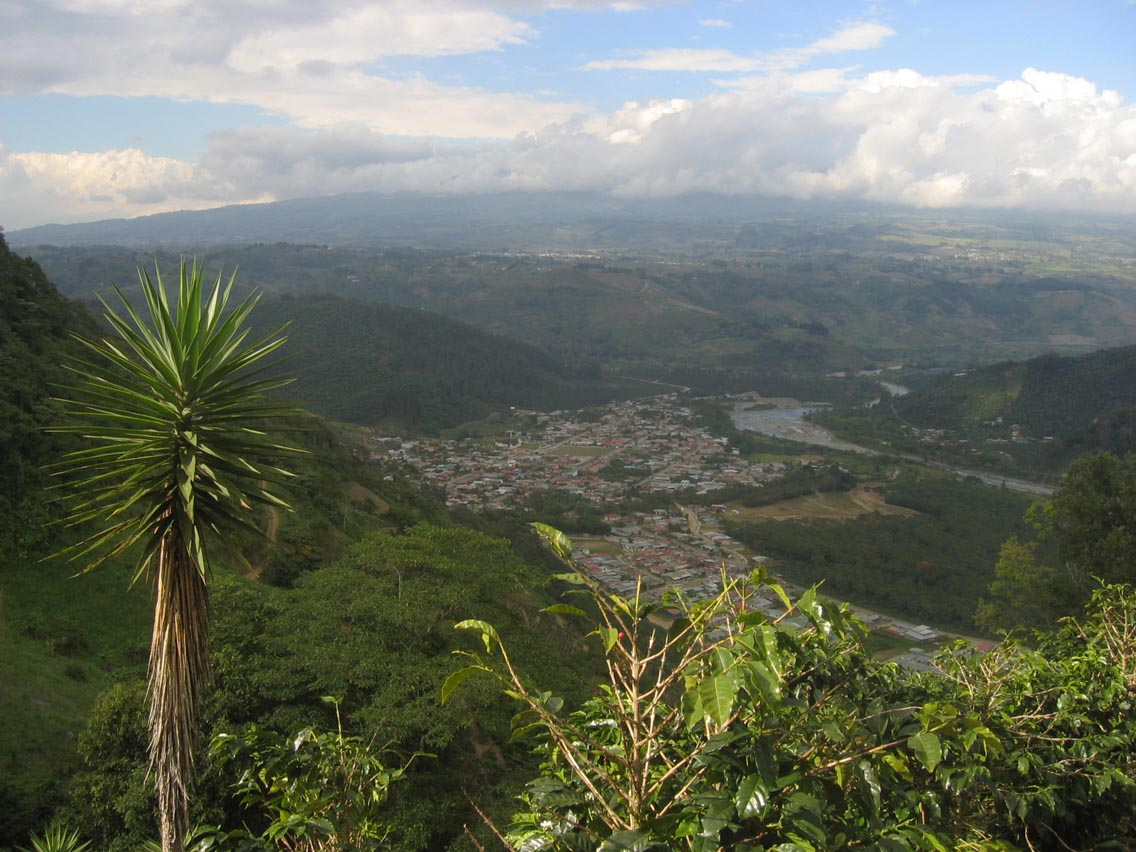
A view of Orosí, Costa Rica

=== Africa ===
- Albertine Rift
- East African Rift
- Ethiopian Rift Valley
- Great Rift Valley
- Nile Valley (Egypt/Sudan/Ethiopia/Uganda)
- Nugaal Valley (Somalia)
- Umba Valley (Tanzania)
- Valley of the Kings (Egypt)

=== Asia ===
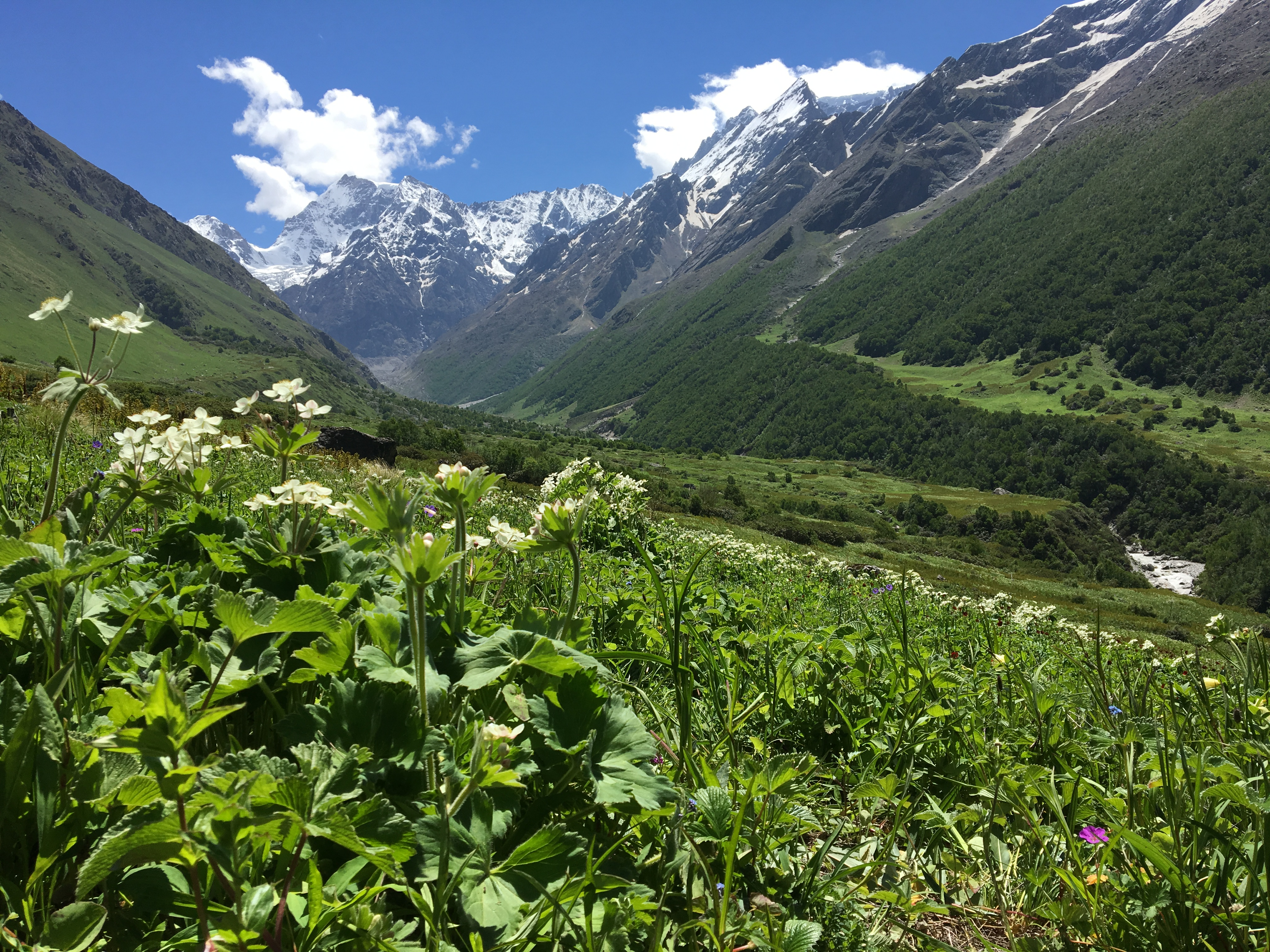
The Valley of Flowers in Uttarakhand, India

- Beqaa Valley (Lebanon)
- Dang Valley (Western Nepal)
- Emin Valley (Kazakhstan)
- Ihlara, Turkey
- Jordan Rift Valley (Jordan - Israel)
- Jordan Valley
- Kathmandu (Nepal)
- Klang Valley (Malaysia)
- Mahaweli (Sri Lanka)
- Panjshir Valley (Afghanistan)
- Valleys of China
  - Baligou Valley
  - Emin Valley
  - Heizhu Valley
  - Insukati Valley
  - Jiuzhaigou Valley
  - Mutou Valley

=== Oceania ===
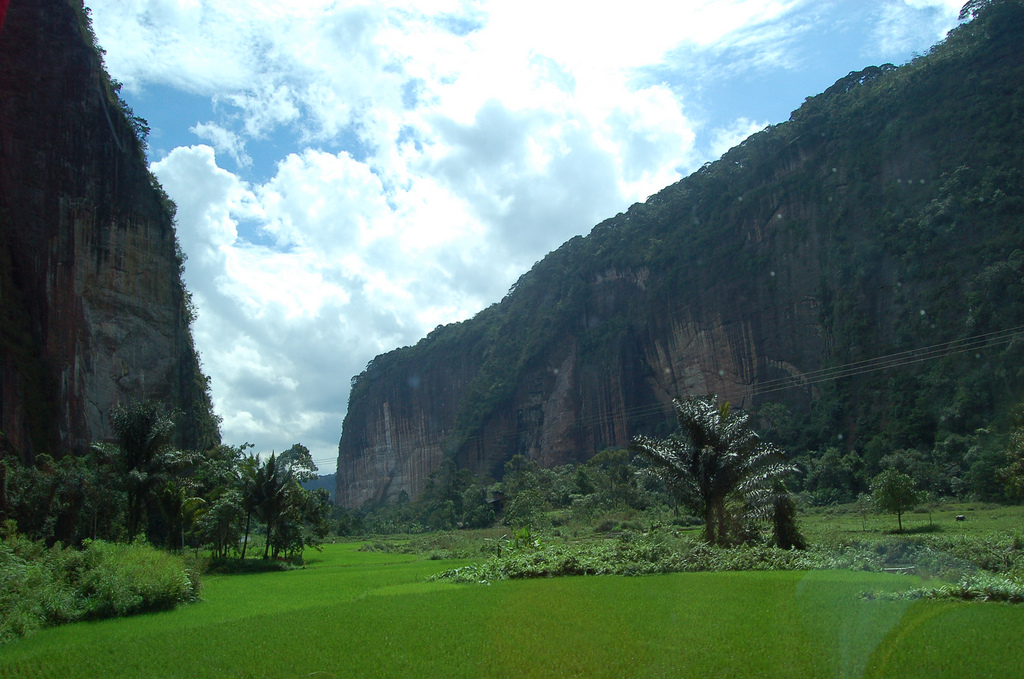
The Harau Valley in West Sumatra, Indonesia

- Barossa Valley (Australia)
- Bulolo Valley (Papua New Guinea)
- Cagayan Valley (Philippines)
- Capertee Valley (Australia)
- Hunter Valley (Australia)
- Hutt Valley (New Zealand)
- Kangaroo Valley (Australia)
- Markham Valley (Papua New Guinea)
- Strath Taieri (New Zealand)
- Swan Valley (Australia)

=== Europe ===
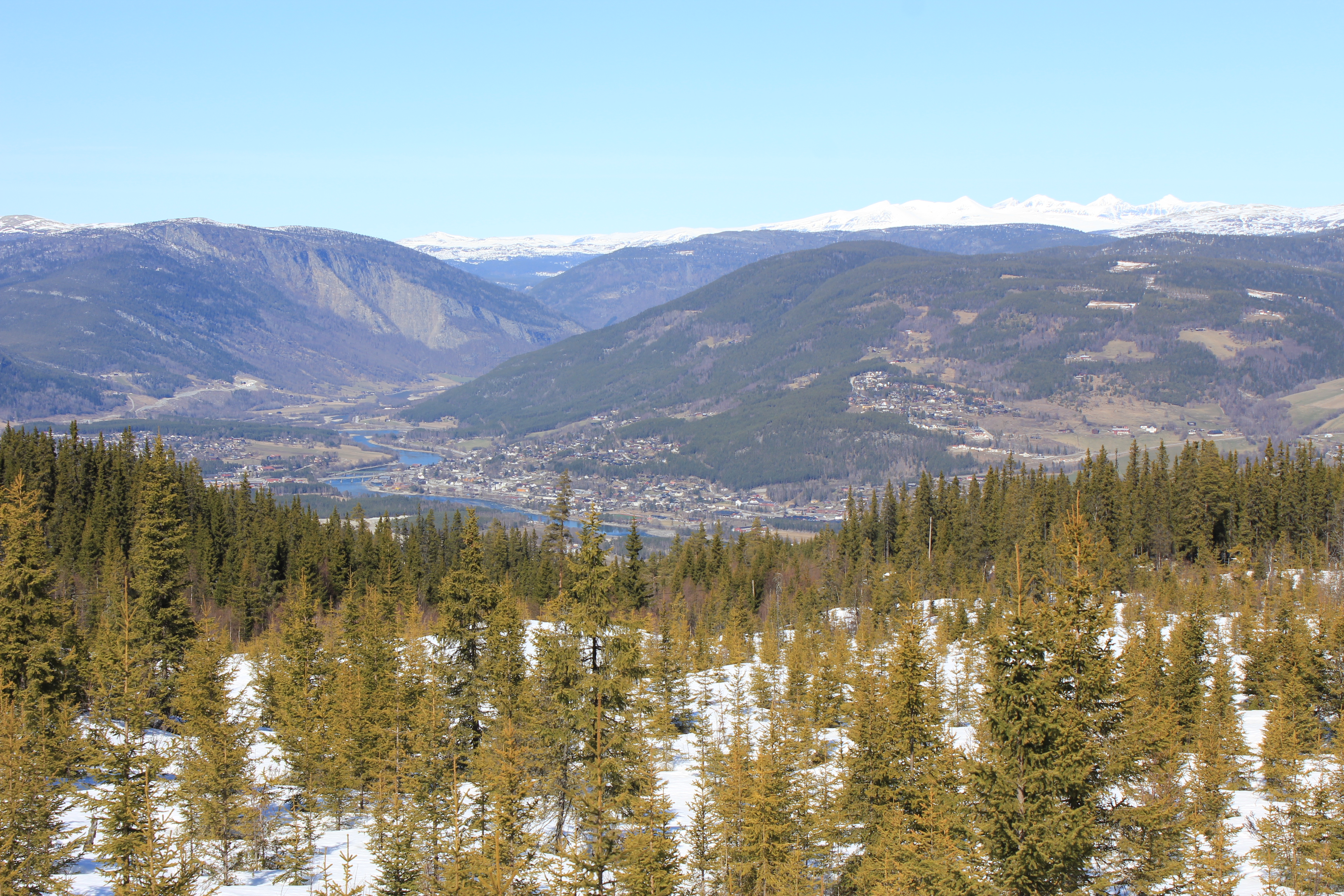
The Gudbrandsdalen in Eastern Norway near Gålå

- Bergensdalen (Vestland, Norway)
- Danube Valley (Eastern Europe)
- Evrotas Valley, Sparta (Greece)
- Gauldal (Trøndelag, Norway)
- Glen Coe (Scotland, United Kingdom)
- Glåmdal (Innlandet, Norway)
- Great Glen (Scotland, United Kingdom)
- Gudbrandsdalen (Oppland, Norway)
- Hallingdalen (Buskerud, Norway)
- Iron Gates (Romania/Serbia)
- Kvinesdal (Agder, Norway)
- Lauterbrunnen Valley (Bern, Switzerland)
- Loire Valley with its famous castles (France)
- Namdalen (Trøndelag, Norway)
- Nant Ffrancon (Wales, United Kingdom)
- Numedalen (Buskerud, Norway)
- Orkdalen (Trøndelag, Norway)
- Østerdalen (Innlandet, Norway)
- Po Valley, (Italy)
- Rhone Valley from the Matterhorn to Grenoble and Lyon (France)
- Romsdalen (Møre Og Romsdal, Norway)
- Setesdal (Agder, Norway)
- Sirdalen (Agder, Norway)
- South Wales Valleys (Wales, United Kingdom)
- Upper Rhine Valley or Upper Rhine Plain, an old graben system. (France and Germany)
- Valdres (Innlandet, Norway)
- Vestfjorddalen (Telemark, Norway)

=== North America ===
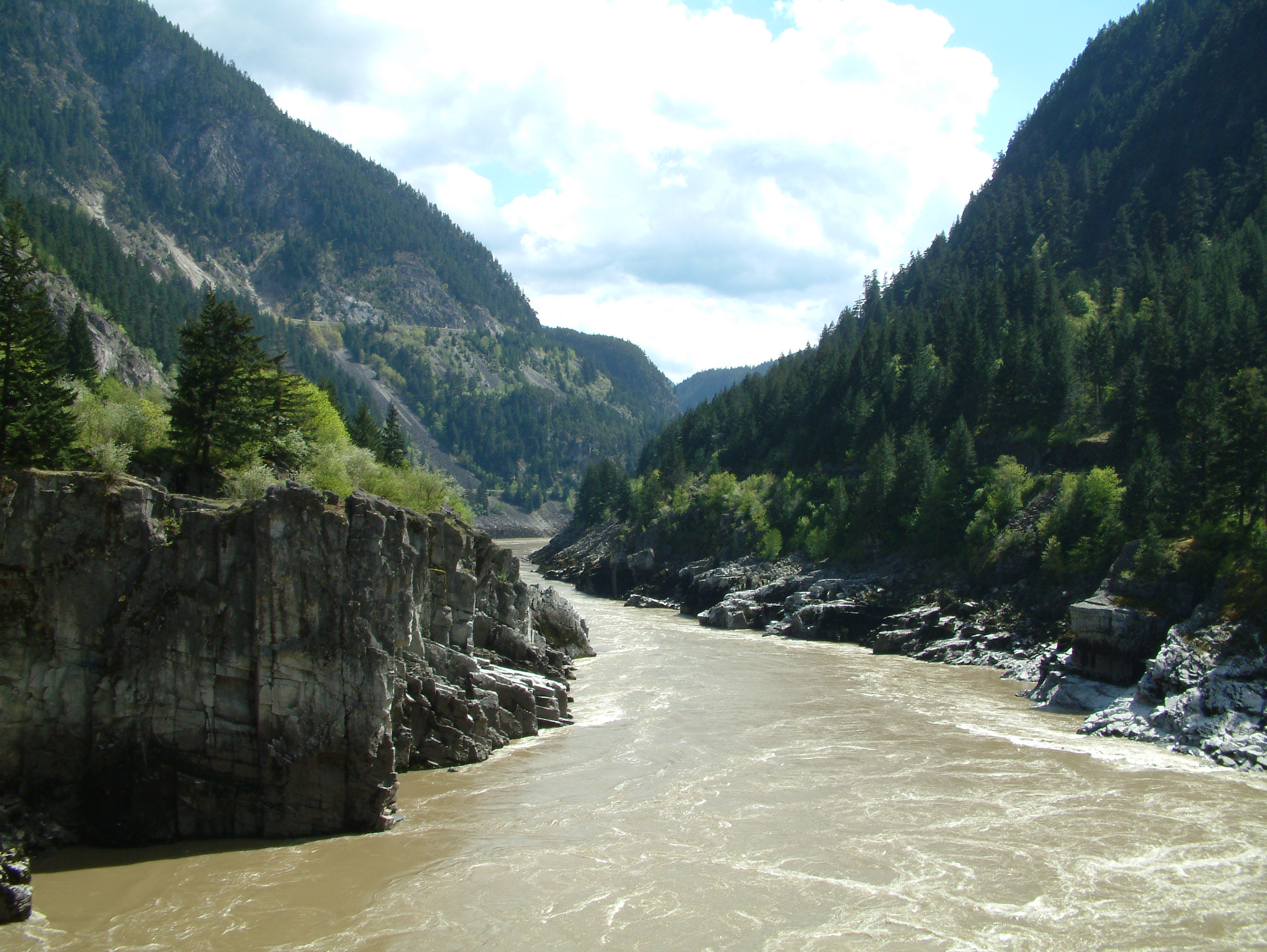
Hell's Gate, British Columbia

- Central Valley (California)
- Coachella Valley (California)
- Cumberland Valley (Maryland/Pennsylvania)
- Cuyahoga Valley (Ohio)
- Death Valley (California)
- Fraser Canyon (British Columbia)
- Fraser Valley (British Columbia)
- Grand Canyon (Arizona, United States)
- Hell's Gate (British Columbia)
- Hudson Valley (New York)
- Imperial Valley (California)
- Las Vegas Valley (Nevada)
- Missouri River Valley (Missouri)
- Monument Valley (Arizona, Utah)
- Napa Valley (California)
- Okanagan Valley (British Columbia)
- Ottawa Valley (Ontario/Quebec)
- Palo Duro Canyon (Texas)
- Valley of the Sun (Arizona)
- Rio Grande Valley (Texas)
- Rocky Mountain Trench (British Columbia/Montana)
- Saint Lawrence Valley (Ontario/Quebec/New York)
- Salt Lake Valley (Utah)
- San Fernando Valley (California)
- Shenandoah Valley (Virginia/West Virginia)
- Sonoma Valley (California)
- Toluca Valley (Mexico)
- Valley of the Gods (Utah)
- Valley of Mexico (Mexico)
- Willamette Valley (Oregon)
- Yosemite Valley (California)

=== South America ===
- Aburra Valley (Colombia)
- Calchaquí Valleys (Argentina)
- Cauca Valley (Colombia)
- Ischigualasto Valley of the Moon (Argentina)
- Paraíba Valley (Brazil)

=== Antarctica ===
- West Antarctic Rift System

== Extraterrestrial valleys ==
Numerous elongate depressions have been identified on the surface of Mars, Venus, the Moon, and other planets and their satellites and are known as valles (singular: 'vallis'). Deeper valleys with steeper sides (akin to canyons) on certain of these bodies are known as chasmata (singular: 'chasma'). Long narrow depressions are referred to as fossae (singular: 'fossa'). These are the Latin terms for 'valley, 'gorge' and 'ditch' respectively. The German term 'rille' or Latin term 'rima' (signifying 'cleft') is used for certain other elongate depressions on the Moon.

See also:

- List of valleys on Mars
- List of chasmata on Mars
- List of valleys on the Moon
- List of largest rifts, canyons and valleys in the Solar System

== See also ==
- Grass valley – Meadow within a forested and relatively small drainage basin
- Gully – Landform created by running water and/or mass movement eroding sharply into soil
- Paleovalley – Inactive river or stream channel that has been filled or buried
- Stream channel – Narrow body of water
