= Bezeklik Thousand Buddha Caves =

Buddhist cave grottos in Xinjiang, China

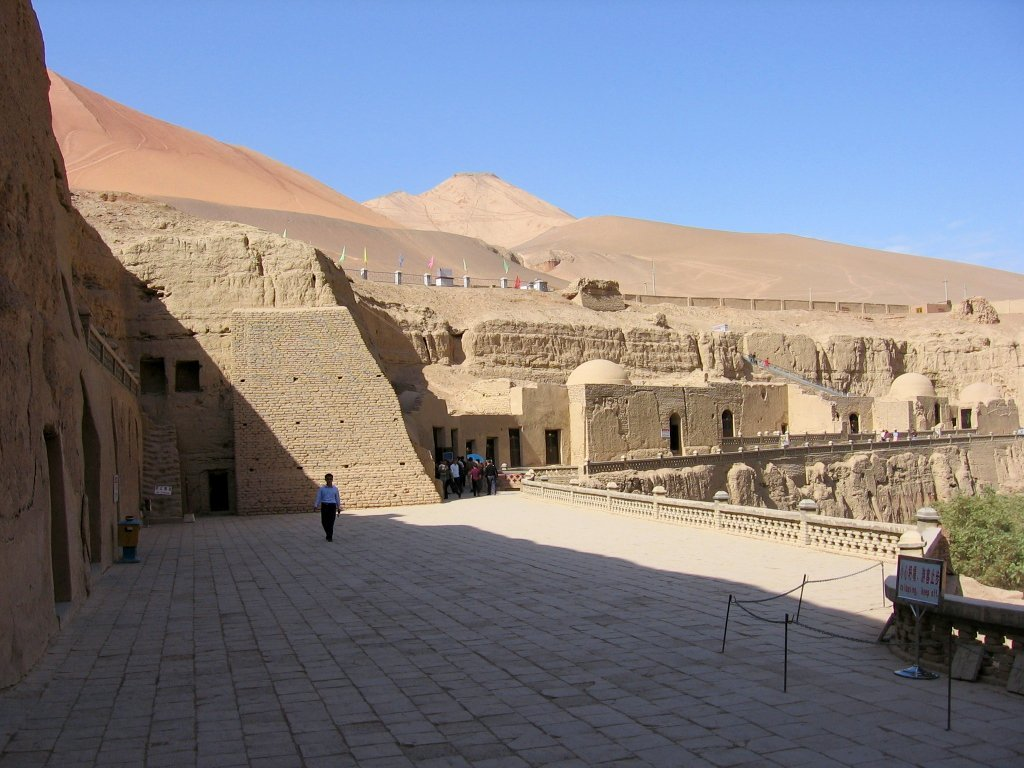
- The caves in 2005

- Location within Xinjiang Location within China
- Coordinates: 42°57′21″N 89°32′22″E

The Bezeklik Thousand Buddha Caves (Chinese: 柏孜克里克千佛洞; pinyin: Bózīkèlǐkè Qiānfódòng; Uyghur: بزقلیق مىڭ ئۆيى) is a complex of Buddhist cave grottos dating from the 5th to 14th century between the cities of Turpan and Shanshan (Loulan) at the north-east of the Taklamakan Desert near the ancient ruins of Gaochang in the Mutou Valley, a gorge in the Flaming Mountains, in the Xinjiang region of western China. They are high on the cliffs of the west Mutou Valley under the Flaming Mountains, and most of the surviving caves date from the West Uyghur kingdom around the 10th to 13th centuries.

== Bezeklik murals ==
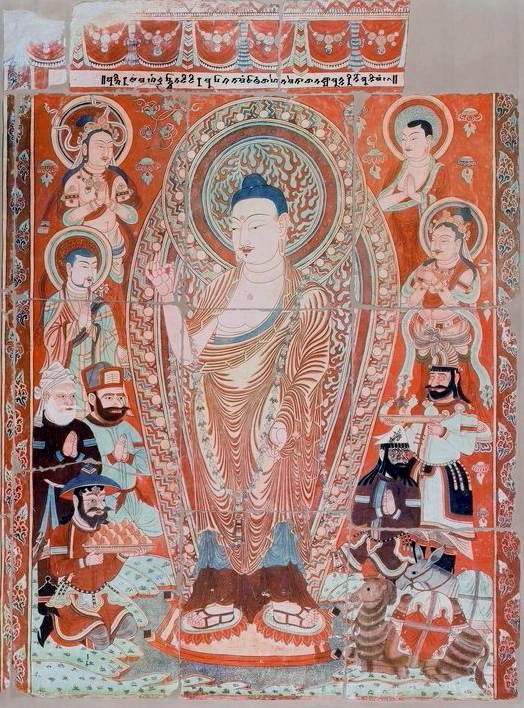
Praṇidhi scene, temple 9 (Cave 20), with kneeling figures with tributes praying in front of the Buddha who Albert von Le Coq assumed were Persians. However, modern scholarship has identified them as Sogdians, an Eastern Iranian people who inhabited Turfan during the phases of Tang Chinese (7th-8th century) and Uyghur rule (9th–13th centuries).

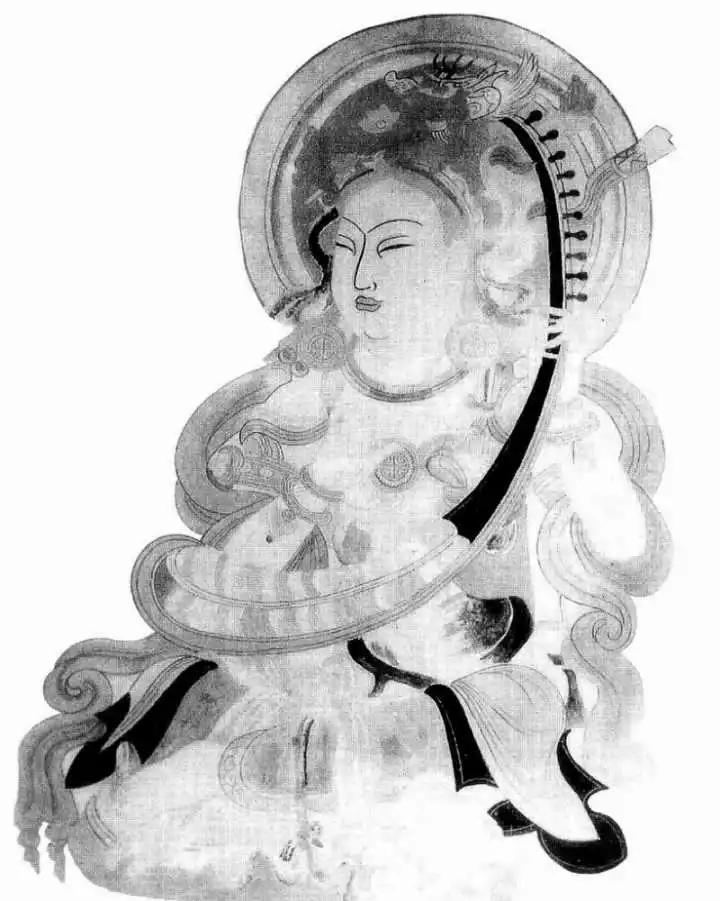
Phoenix-headed konghou, 10th century A.D., cave 48.

There are 77 rock-cut caves at the site. Most have rectangular spaces with round arch ceilings often divided into four sections, each with a mural of the Buddha. The effect is of the entire ceiling covered with hundreds of Buddha murals. Some murals show a large Buddha surrounded by other figures, including Turks, Indians, and Europeans. The quality of the murals varies with some being artistically naive while others are masterpieces of religious art. The murals that best represent the Bezeklik Thousand Buddha Caves are the large-sized murals, which were given the name the "Praṇidhi Scene", paintings depicting Sakyamuni’s "promise" or "praṇidhi" from his past life.

James A. Millward described the original Uyghurs as physically Mongoloid, giving as an example the images in Bezeklik at temple 9 of the Uyghur patrons, until they began to mix with the Tarim Basin's original Indo-European Tocharian inhabitants. However, according to a genetic study of early Uyghur remains from the Uyghur Khaganate in Mongolia, the Uyghurs were actually predominantly West Eurasian, being modelled as genetically similar to the Iranian Alan and Sarmatian people, with significant East Eurasian admixture. The east–west admixture in the Uyghur Khaganate was said to have taken place around the year 500 AD. Buddhist Uyghurs created the Bezeklik murals. However, Peter B. Golden writes that the Uyghurs not only adopted the writing system and religious faiths of the Iranian Sogdians, such as Manichaeism, Buddhism, and Christianity, but also looked to the Sogdians as "mentors" while gradually replacing them in their roles as Silk Road traders and purveyors of culture. Indeed, Sogdians wearing silk robes are seen in the praṇidhi scenes of Bezeklik murals, particularly Scene 6 from Temple 9 showing Sogdian donors to the Buddha. The paintings of Bezeklik, while having a small amount of Indian influence, is primarily influenced by Chinese and Iranian styles, particularly Sasanian Persian landscape painting. Albert von Le Coq was the first to study the murals and published his findings in 1913. He noted how in Scene 14 from Temple 9 one of the West Eurasian-looking figures with green eyes, wearing a green fur-trimmed coat and presenting a bowl with what he assumed were bags of gold dust, wore a hat that he found reminiscent of the headgear of Sasanian Persian princes.

The Buddhist Uyghurs of the Kingdom of Qocho and Turfan were converted to Islam by conquest during a ghazat (holy war) at the hands of the Muslim Chagatai Khanate ruler Khizr Khoja (r. 1389–1399). After being converted to Islam, the descendants of the previously Buddhist Uyghurs in Turfan failed to retain the memory of their ancestral legacy and falsely believed that the "infidel Kalmuks" (Dzungars) were the ones who built Buddhist monuments in their area.

The murals at Bezeklik have suffered considerable damage. Many of the temples were damaged by the local Muslim population whose religion proscribed figurative images of sentient beings; all statues were destroyed, some paintings defaced, and others smeared with mud, the eyes and mouths were often gouged out due to the local belief that the figures may otherwise come to life at night. Michael Dillon considered Bezeklik's Thousand Buddha Caves is an example of the religiously motivated iconoclasm against the depiction of religious and human figures. Pieces of murals were also broken off for use as fertilizer by the locals. During the late nineteen and early twentieth century, European and Japanese explorers found intact murals buried in sand, and many were removed and dispersed around the world. Some of the best-preserved murals were removed by German explorer Albert von Le Coq and sent to Germany. Large pieces such as those showing the Praṇidhi scene were permanently fixed to walls in the Museum of Ethnology in Berlin. During the Second World War they could not be removed for safekeeping and were thus destroyed when the museum was caught in the bombing of Berlin by the Allies. Other pieces may now be found in various museums around the world, such as the Hermitage Museum in Saint Petersburg, Tokyo National Museum in Japan, the British Museum in London, and the national museums of Korea and India.

A digital recreation of the Bezeklik murals removed by explorers was shown in Japan.

== Gallery ==
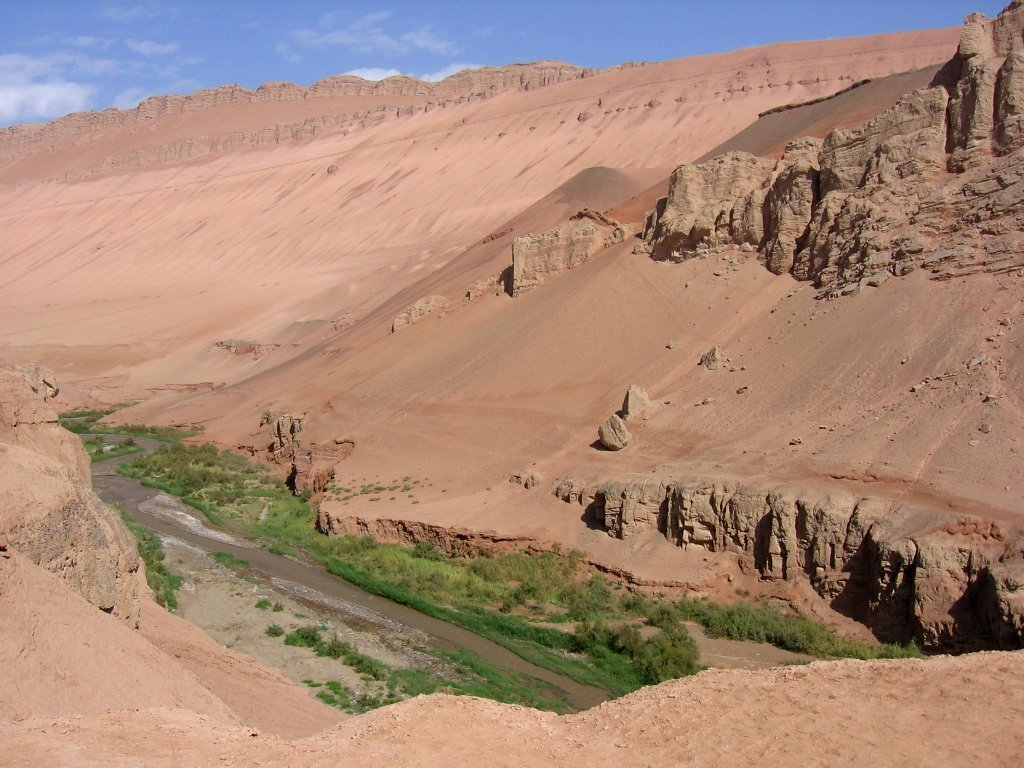
View of the valley

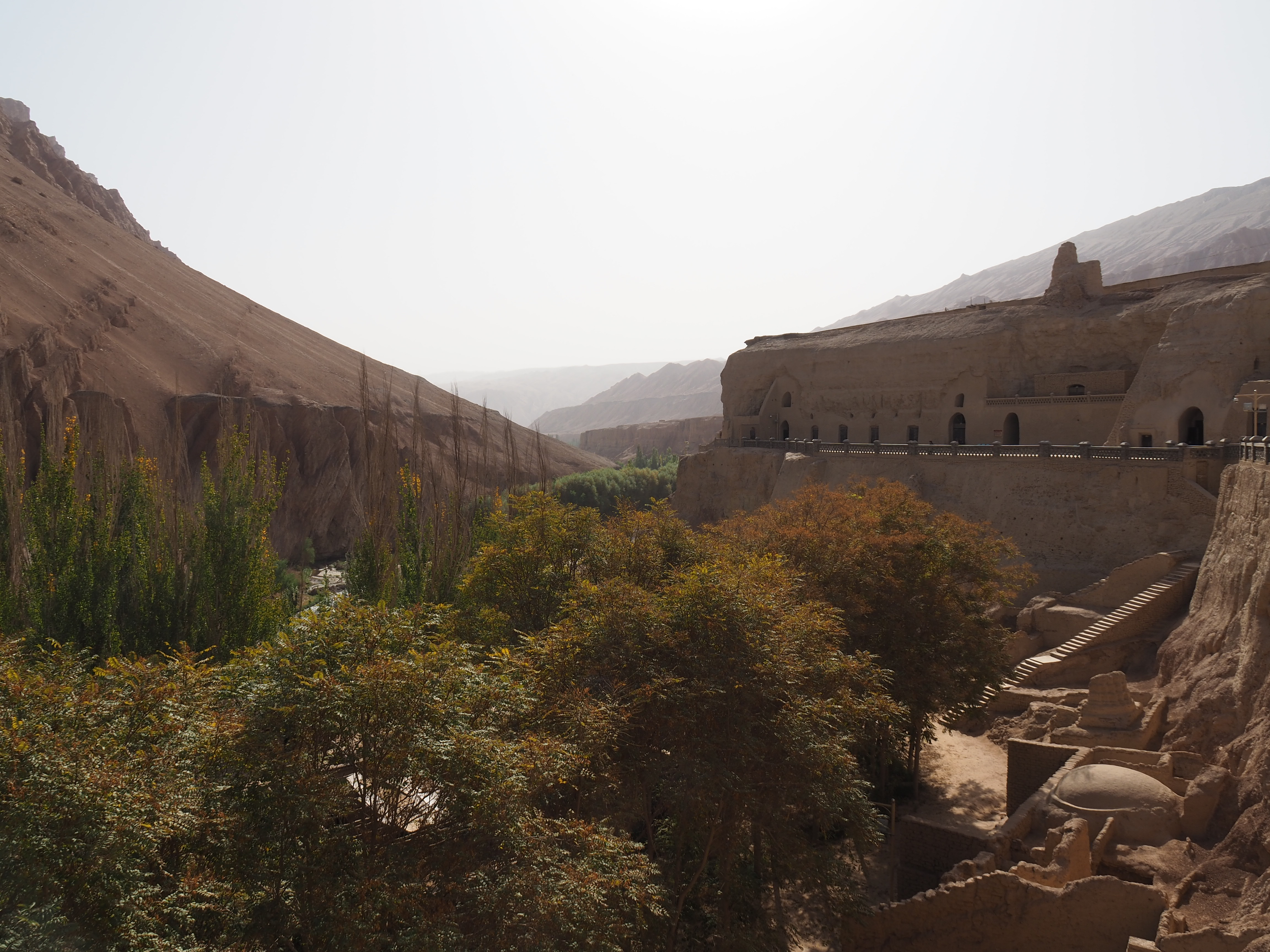
View of caves

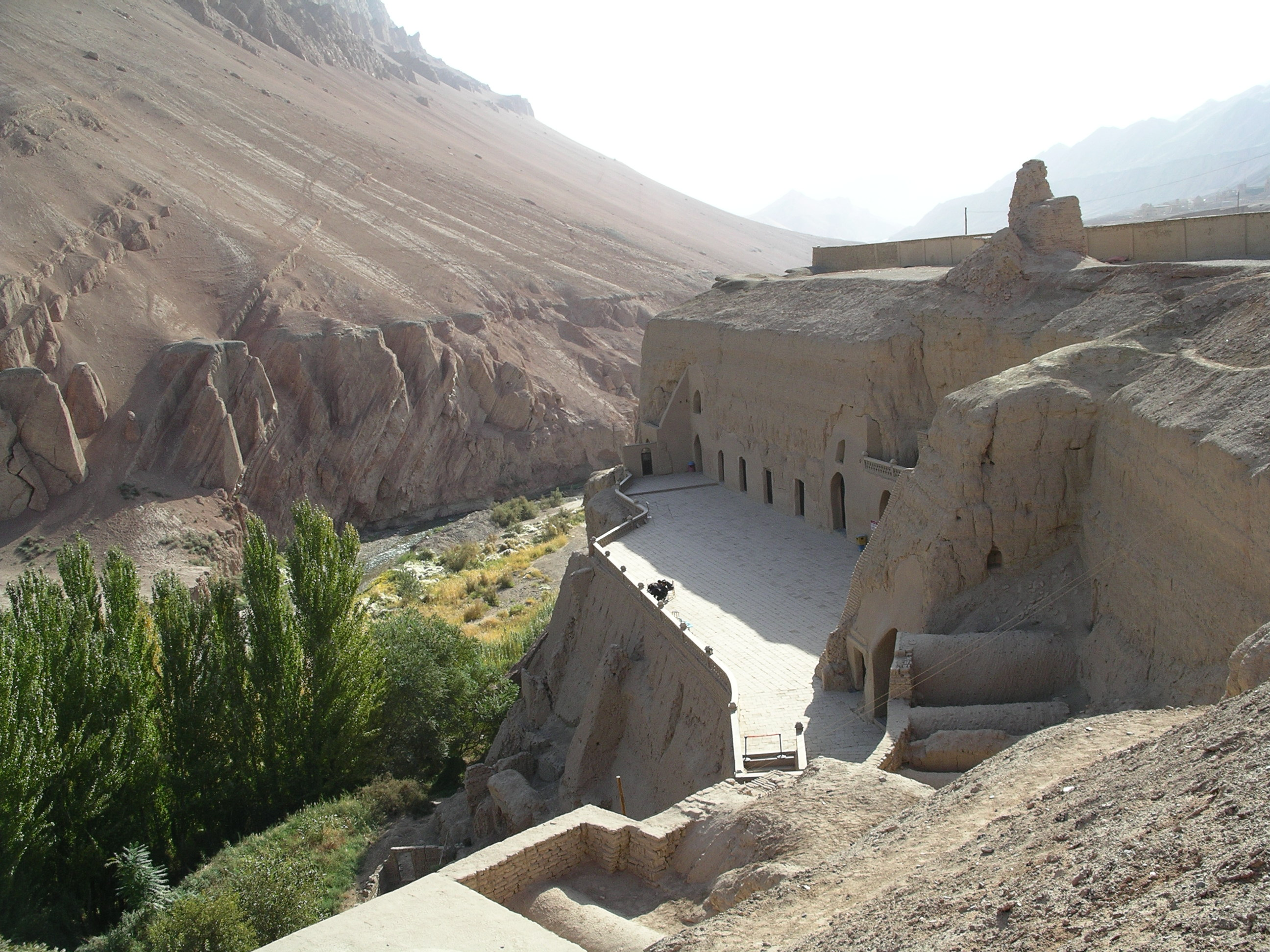
Closer view of caves

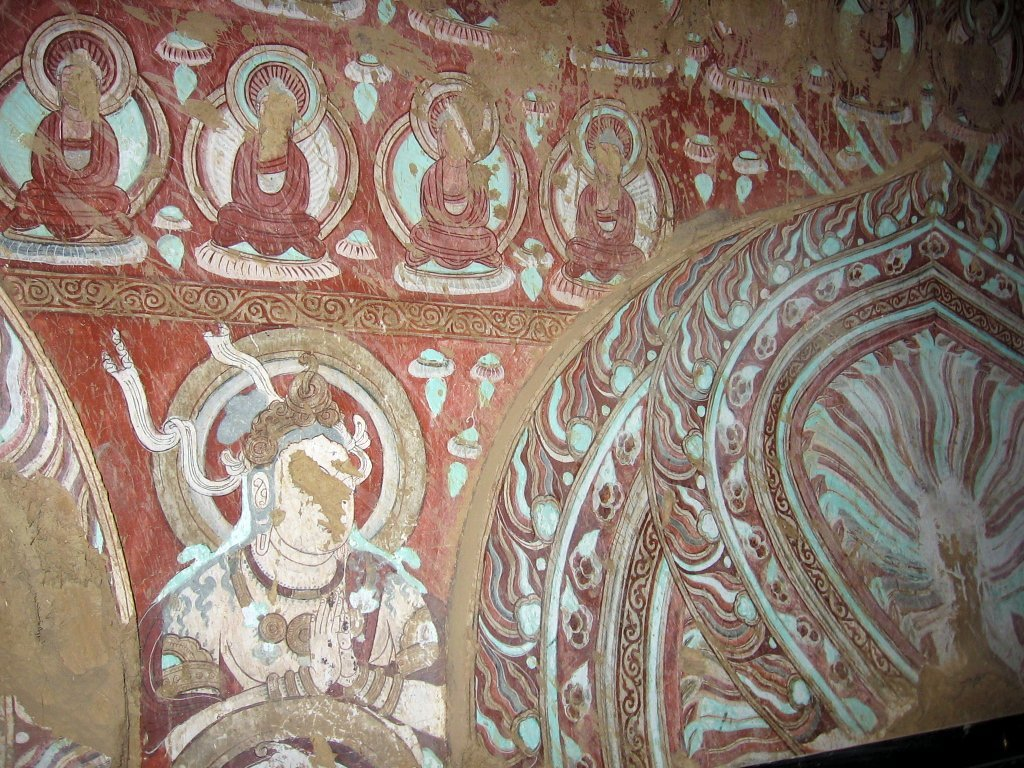
Frescoes of Buddhas

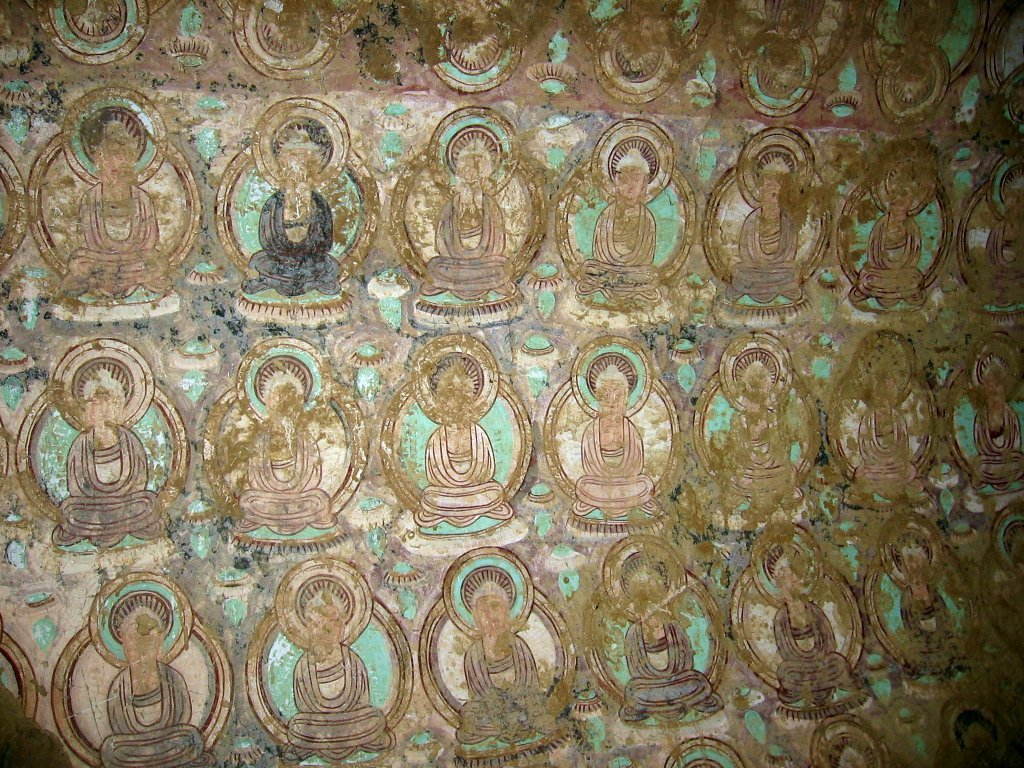
Frescoes of Buddhas

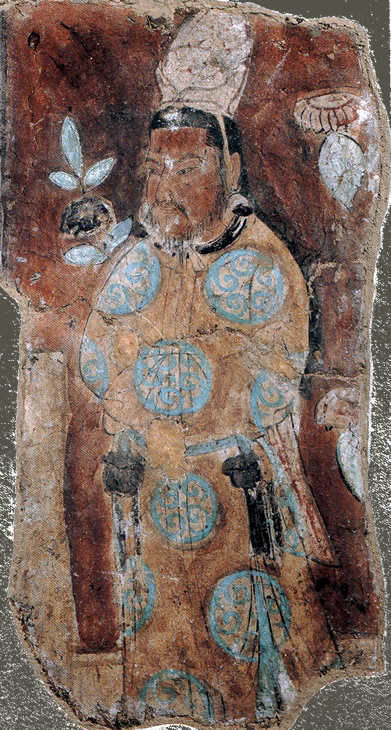
A Uyghur prince

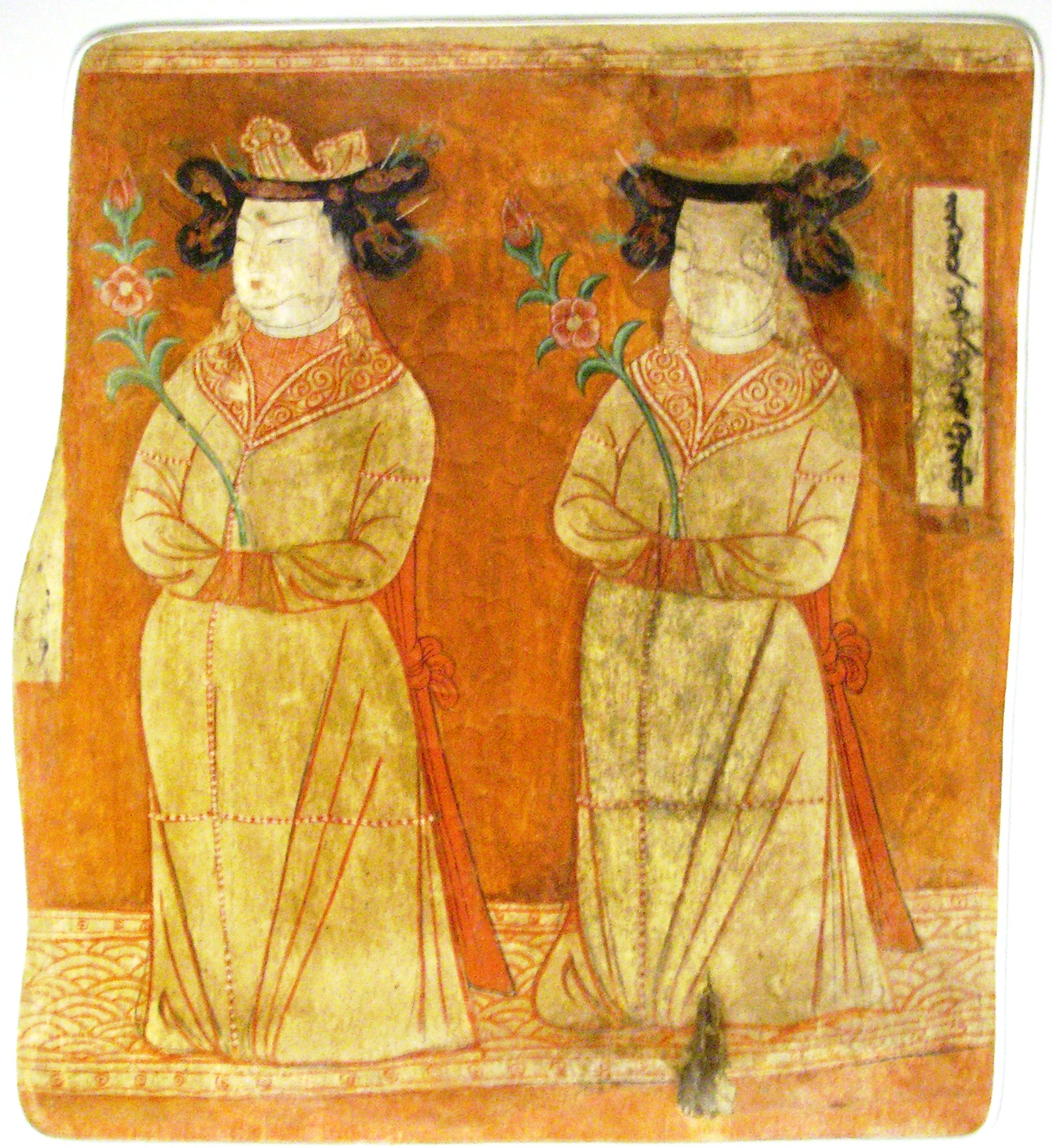
Uyghur princesses, cave 9, Museum für Asiatische Kunst

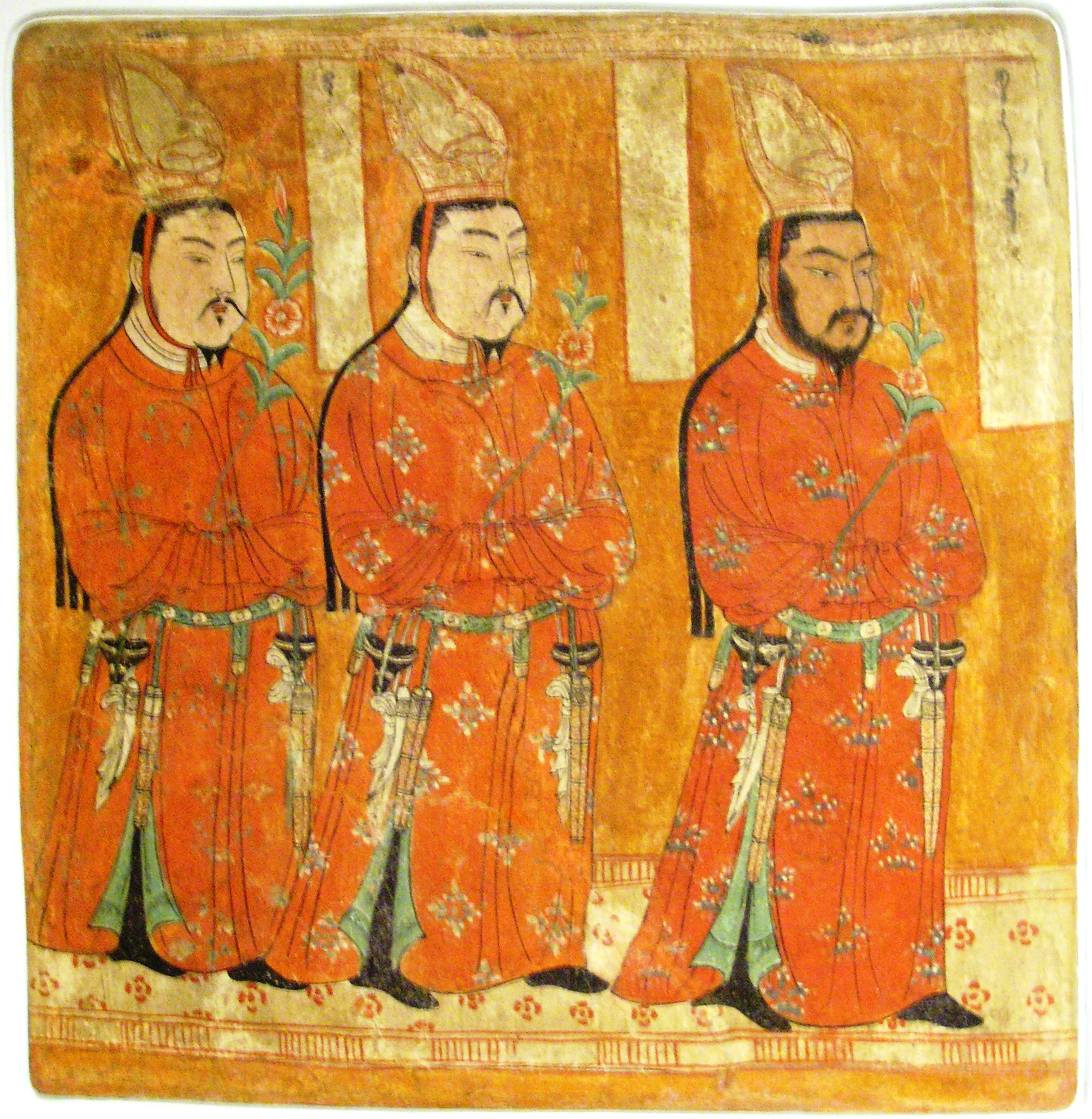
Uyghur Princes wearing robes and headdresses, cave 9.

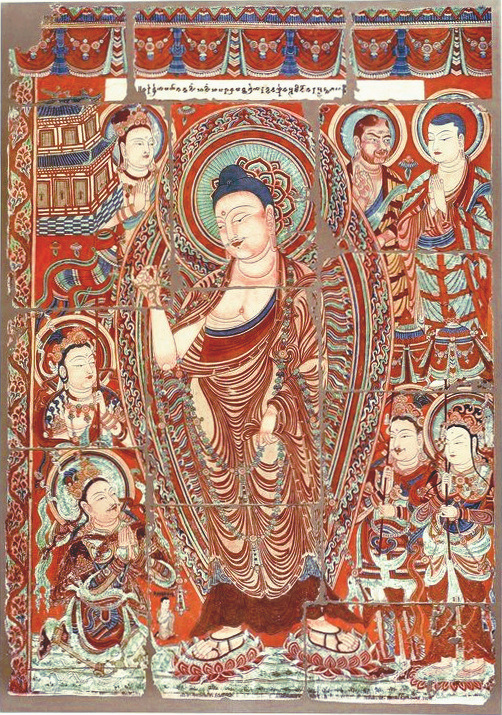
Praṇidhi scene No. 5, Temple No. 9

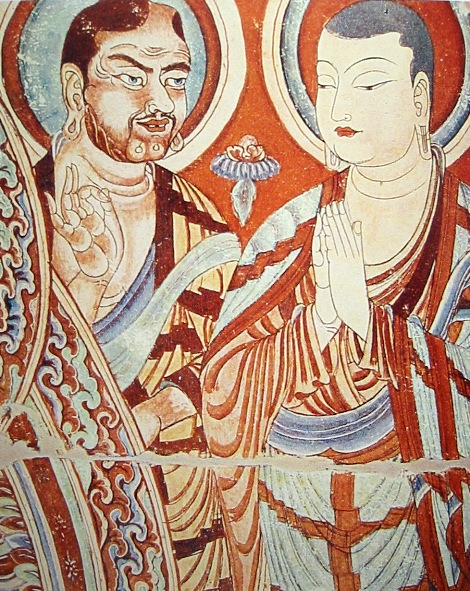
Details from Praṇidhi scene No. 5. Buddhist monks of Tocharian or Sogdian origin on left, and East Asian on right

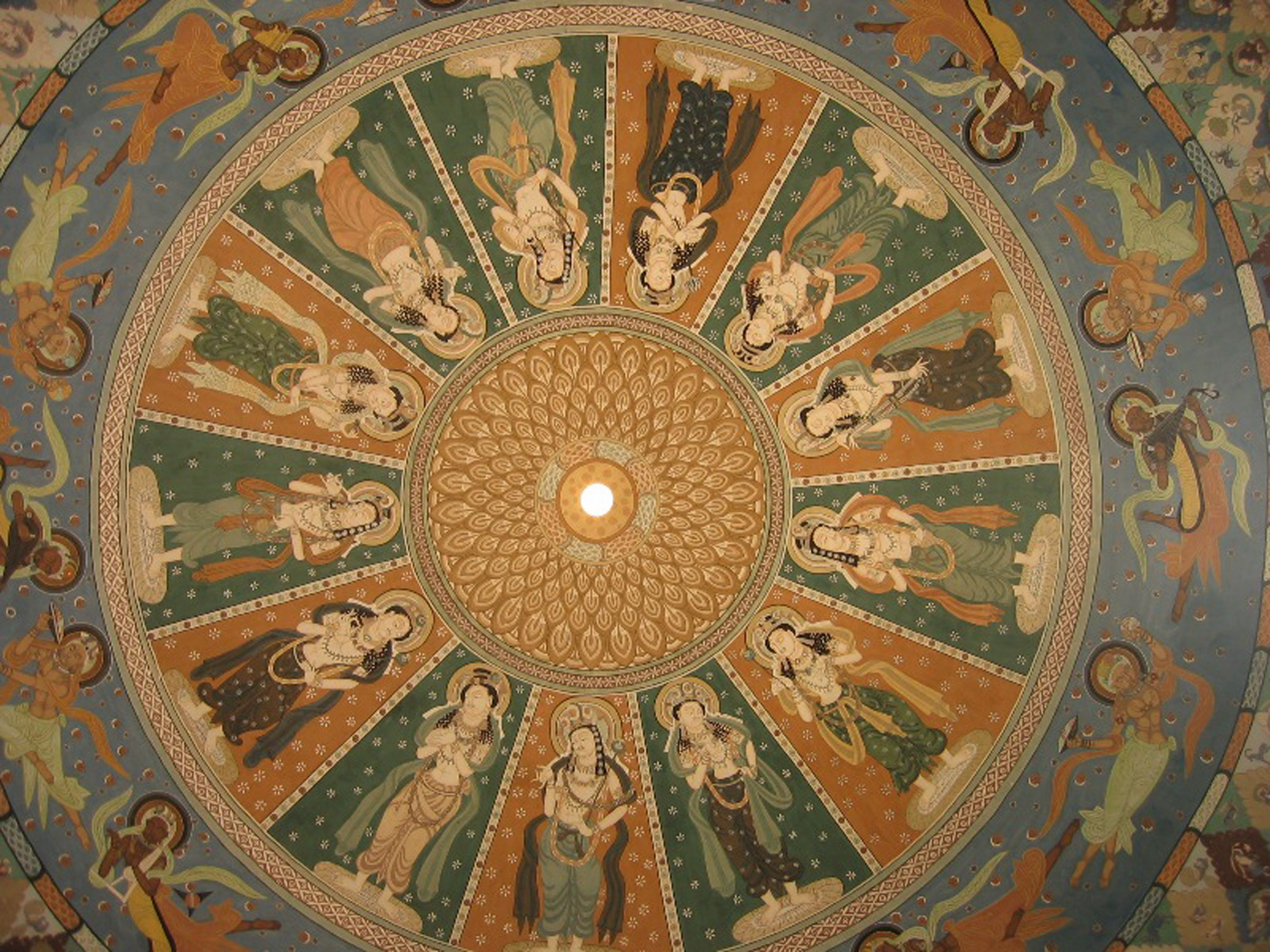
An Uyghur painting from the Bezeklik murals

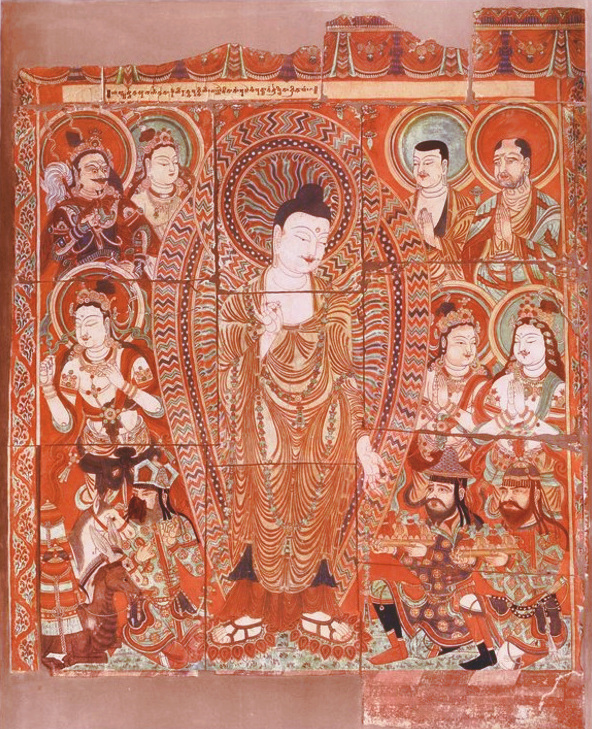
Praṇidhi scene No. 6, Temple No. 9

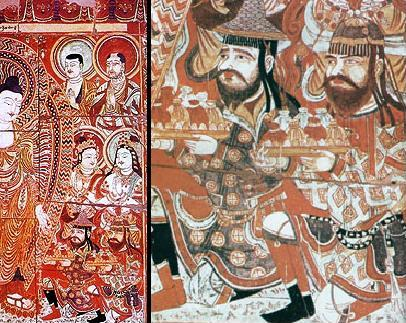
Details showing Sogdian donors to the Buddha

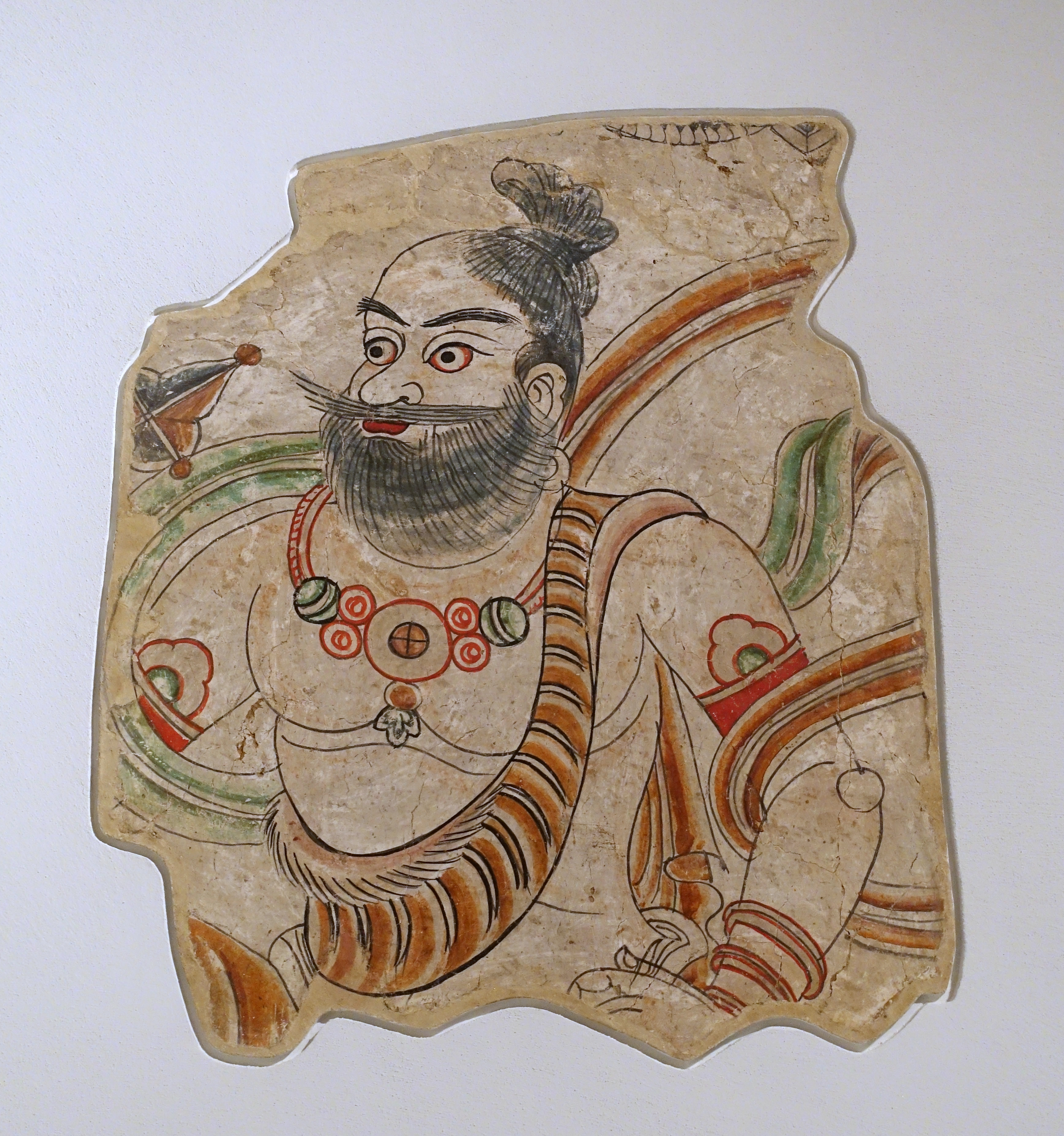
An Indian brahmin figure from Cave 9, dated 8th-9th century AD, wall painting

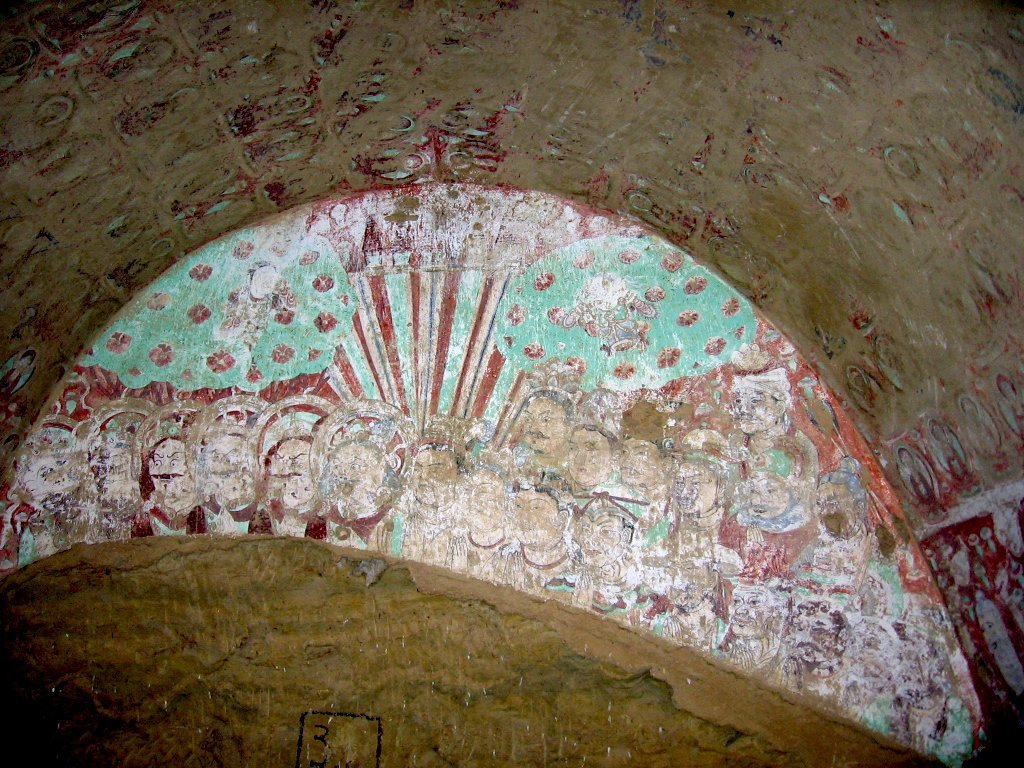

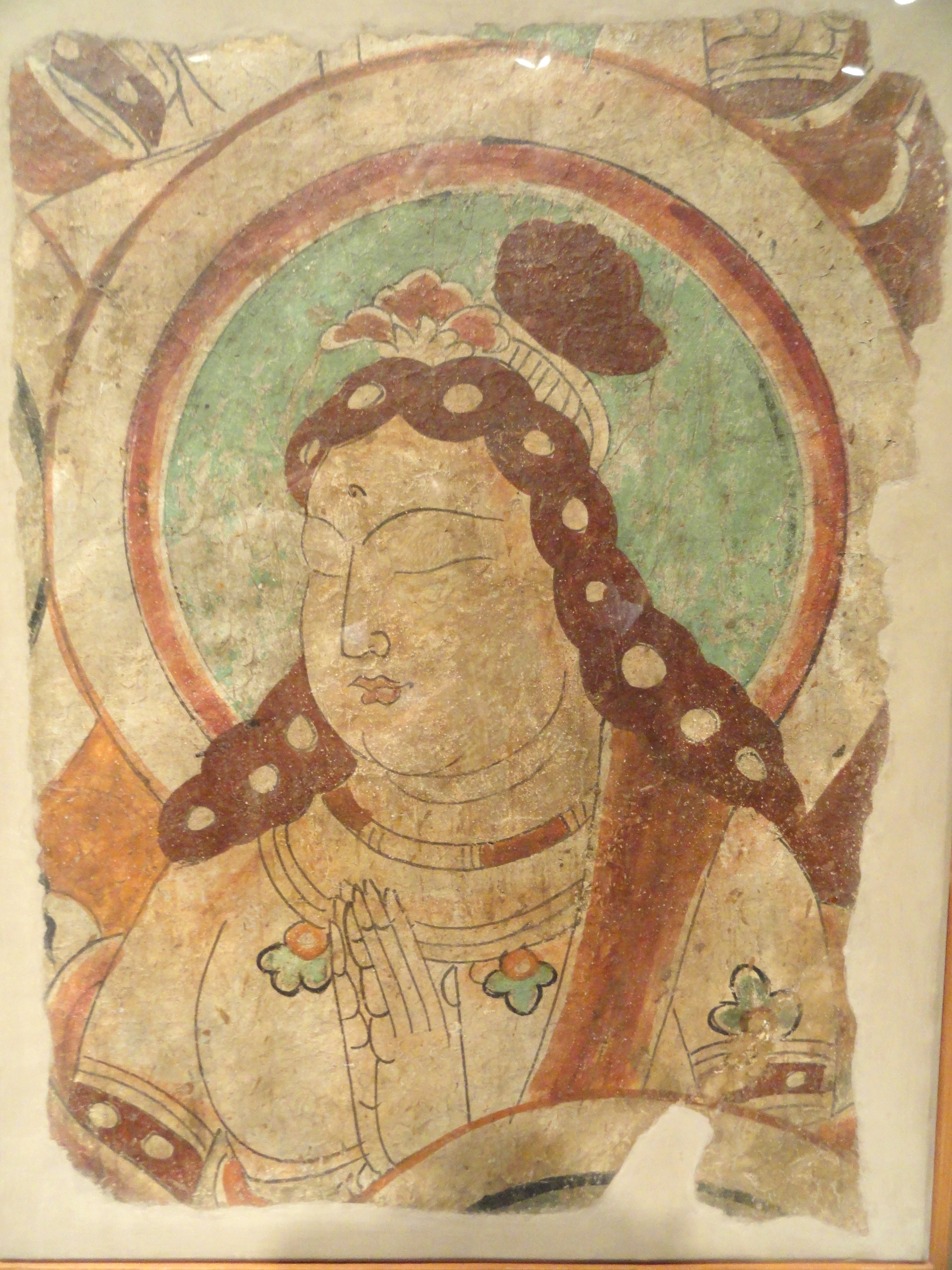
Fragment of a Buddhist Wall Painting

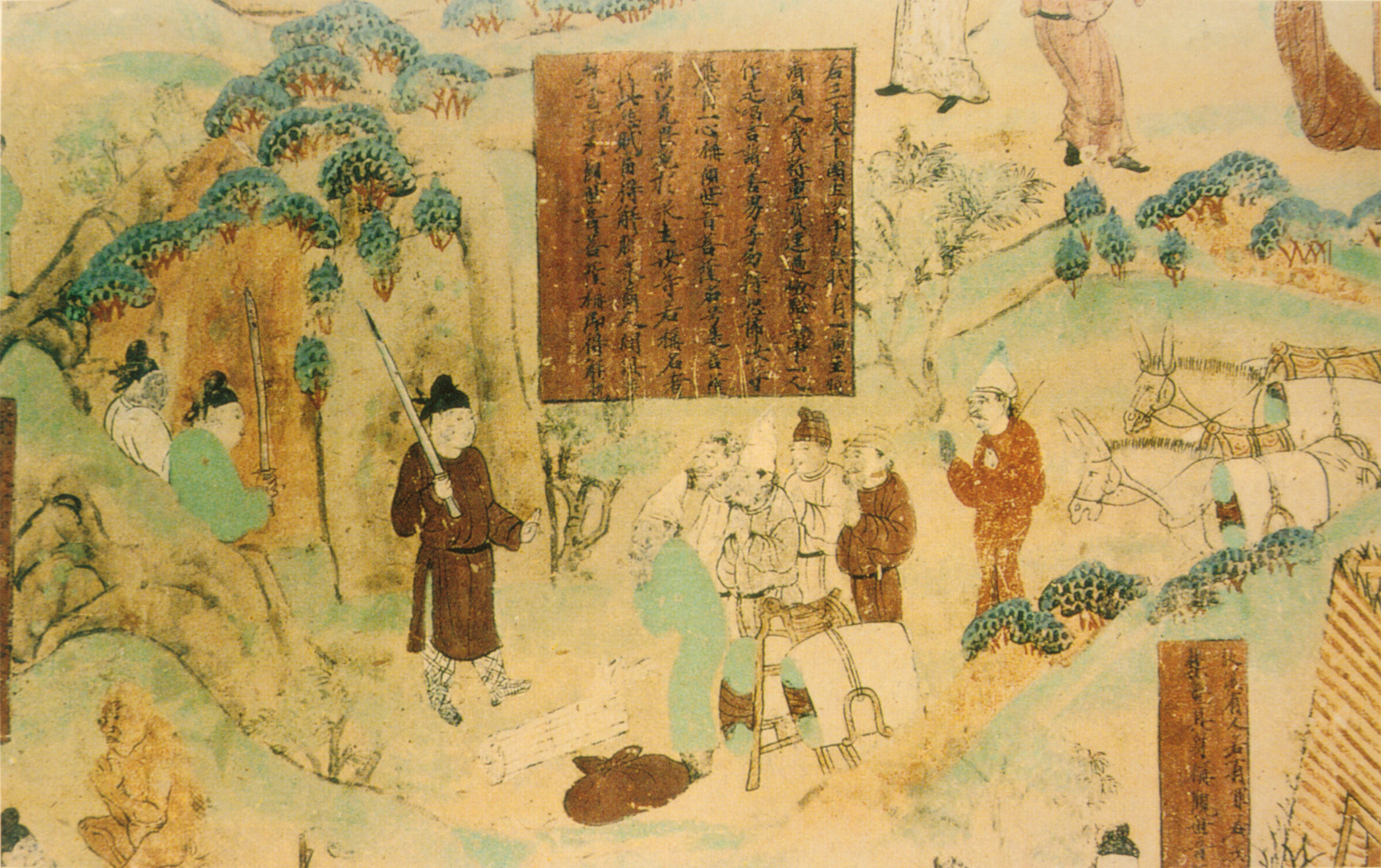
Tradesmen, Tang dynasty

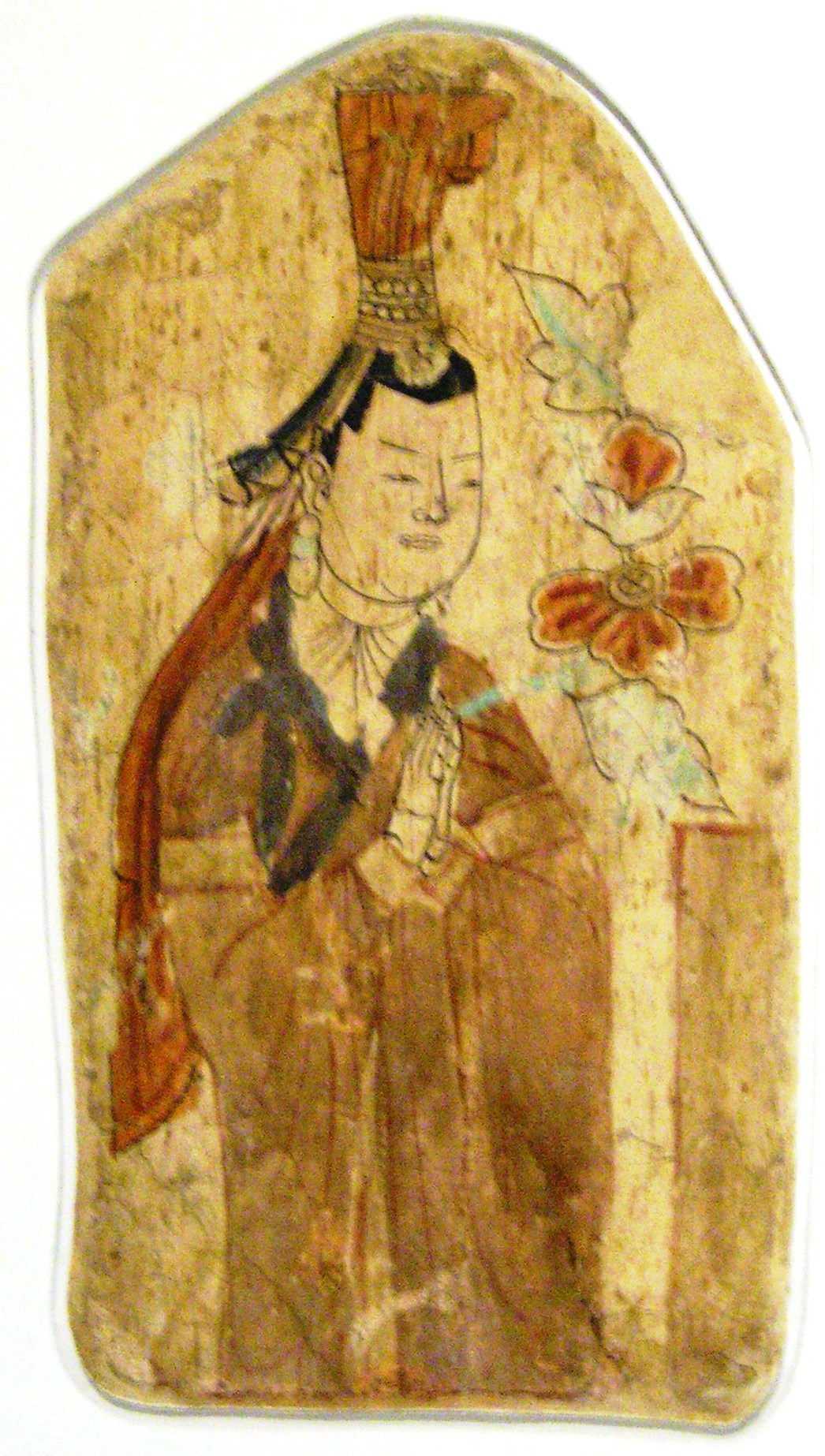
Uyghur female donor from the Bezeklik murals

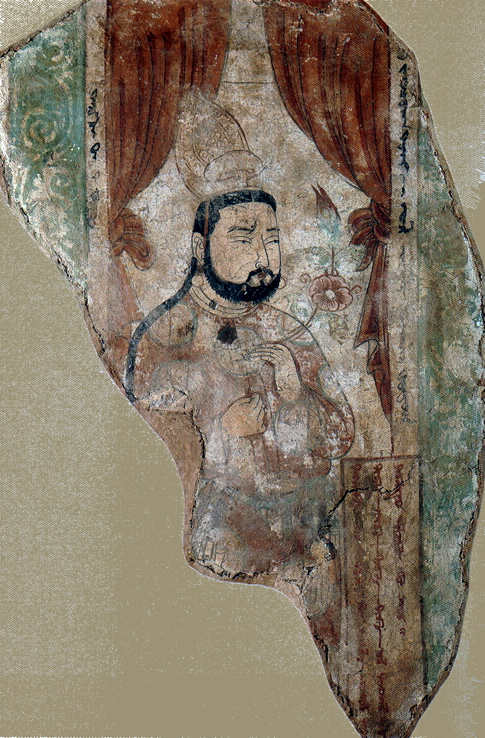
Uyghur noble from the Bezeklik murals

== See also ==
- Ah-ai Grotto
- Mogao Caves
- Kizil Caves
- Tianlongshan Grottoes
- Silk Road transmission of Buddhism
- German Turfan expeditions
