= Mutou Valley =

Valley in Xinjiang, China

Coordinates: 42°56′05″N 89°34′18″E

- Simplified Chinese: 木头沟
- Traditional Chinese: 木頭溝
Transcriptions

The Mutou Valley is located in the Flaming Mountains, near the ancient oasis city of Gaochang on the rim of the Taklamakan Desert in the Xinjiang Autonomous Region, China. Under a cliff in the Mutou Valley is located the Bezeklik Thousand Buddha Caves, a complex of Buddhist caves temples dating from the 5th to the 9th centuries.
