= Heizhu Valley =

Valley in Sichuan, China

Heizhu Valley (simplified Chinese: 黑竹沟; traditional Chinese: 黑竹溝, literally "The Black Bamboo Valley") is a popular tourist attraction, located in Sichuan Province in southwest China. It occupies about 180 km^{2}, bridging the Sichuan Basin and West Sichuan Plateau. The tourist business is maintained by Sichuan Heizhu Group Tourist Development Co., Ltd.
