= Museum of East Asian Art =

Museum of East Asian Art may refer to:

- Museum of East Asian Art, Bath, England
- Museum of East Asian Art (Cologne), Germany
- Museum of Asian Art, Berlin, Germany, known as the Museum of East Asian Art until 2006

== See also ==
- Asian Art Museum (disambiguation)
- Museum of Oriental Art (disambiguation)
