= Leaf from a Manichaean book MIK III 4979 =

Manichaean manuscript fragment

Fragment of Manichae Manuscript MIK III 4979
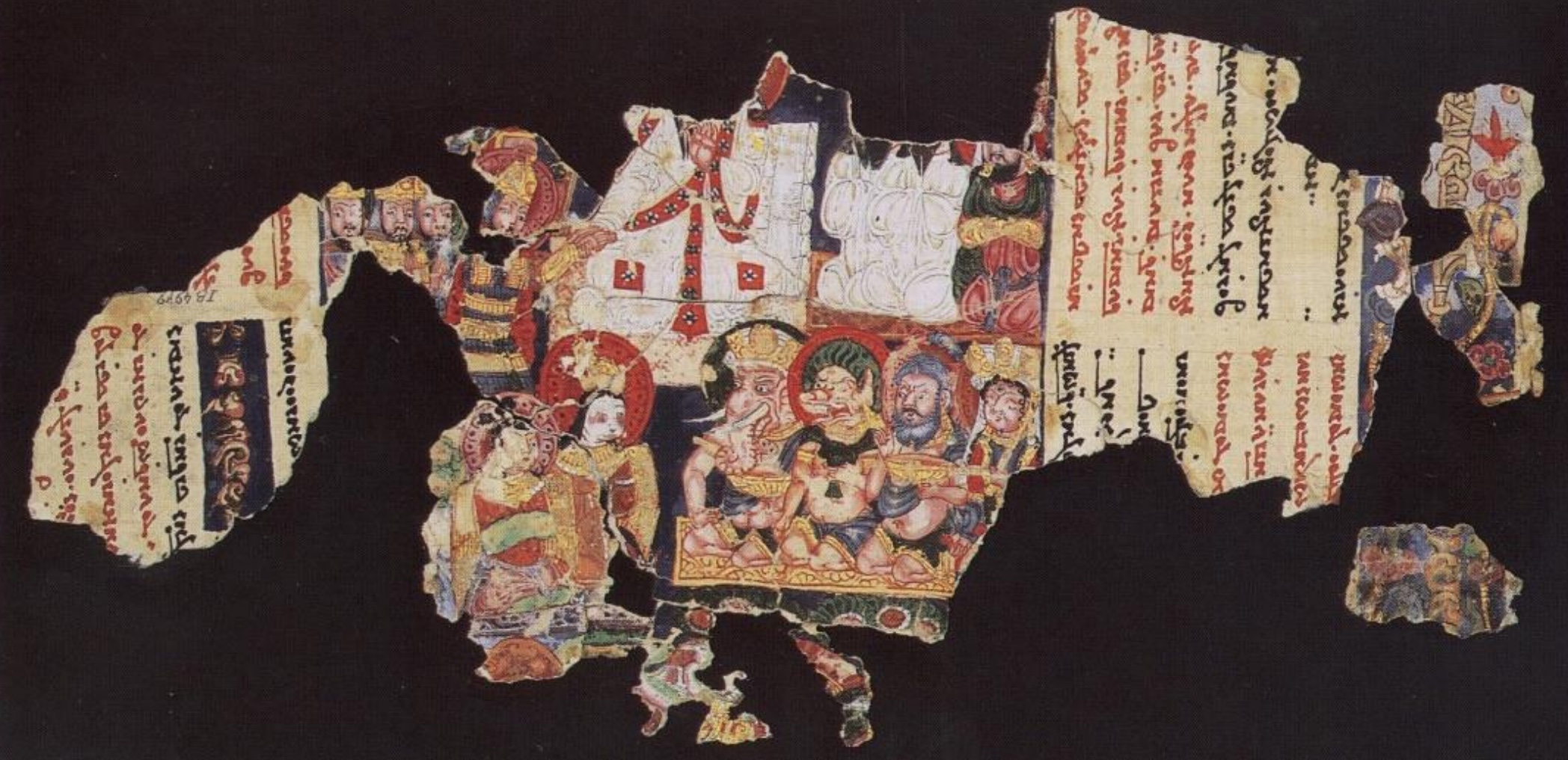
- Front side of broken page
- Size: 12.4 cm long, 25.2 cm wide
- Writing: Sogdian, Turkic and Middle Persian written in Manichaean alphabet
- Created: 8–9th century
- Discovered: German Turpan expedition team at the beginning of the 20th century in Xinjiang Gaochang ruins
- Present location: Berlin Asian Art Museum, Germany
- Identification: MIK III 4979

Manichaean manuscript fragment number "MIK Ⅲ 4979" is a collection Fragments of Manichaean illuminated manuscript in Germany Berlin Asian Art Museum, painted during the 8th–9th centuries, and were found in the early 20th century. German Turpan expedition team found in Xinjiang Gaochang site. The broken page is 12.4 cm long and 25.2 cm wide, with slender painting illustrations drawn on both sides, written in Sogdian in Manuscript, Turkic and Middle Persian text.

== Description ==
=== Front ===
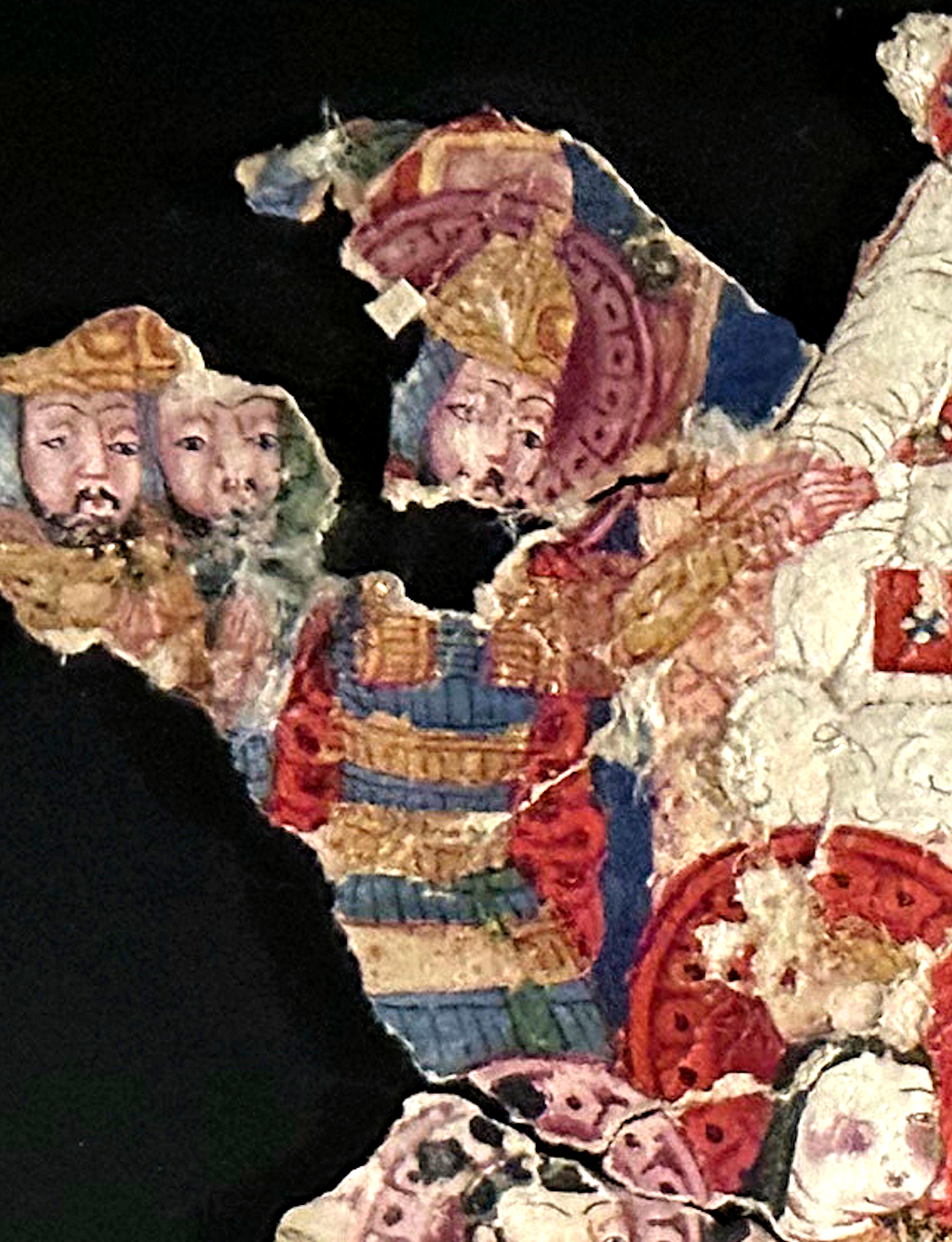
Conversion of Bögü Qaghan, third Khagan of the Uyghur Khaganate, to Manicheism in 762: detail of Bögü Qaghan in a suit of armour, kneeling to a Manichean high priest.

The front illustration of the broken page depicts a Manichae church ritual. A senior priest in a white robe sits above the middle. His head has been completely damaged. It can be seen that he wears a red holy band around his neck and hangs from his shoulders. A circle of arms. He was sitting on a carpet decorated with red diamond-shaped patterns, with a white pillow behind it, and white ribbons draped on the pillow. The priest raised his left hand as a blessing, and his right hand held the hand of a soldier in armor. The man dressed as a soldier was kneeling to receive the blessing of the priest. He was probably a prince or a king, or even portrayed the Uighur King himself, with three attendants behind him. To the right of the priest (from the perspective of the viewer, the same below) sits four people kneeling side by side. The first three are elect in white robes, and the last one is a layman in red robes and green cloak, who should be a hearer.

The scene at the bottom of the screen is very eye-catching. On the right are four gods kneeling in a row. Judging from the characteristics of the image, they should be the Hindu gods depicted: the first Ganesha from the left is undoubtedly the god of wisdom, Ganesha. The second deity with the head of the wild boar should be Raha, one of the ten incarnations of Vishnu, the third is probably Brahma, and the last is Shiva. On the left are two Iranian-Manichean gods sitting facing each other with the four Indian gods on the right. The remaining red headlights can be seen below the two Manichae gods, and the remaining floral ornaments and duck motifs can be seen below the four Indian gods. According to the research of the German religious scientist Hans-Joyakin Klimkaite, the purpose of depicting the four Hindu gods is to express the doctrine of the supreme deity of Manichaeism, the "four-fold majestic deity". The use of Hindu gods is Because it is influenced by the culture of its place-the eastern part of Central Asia.

=== Back ===
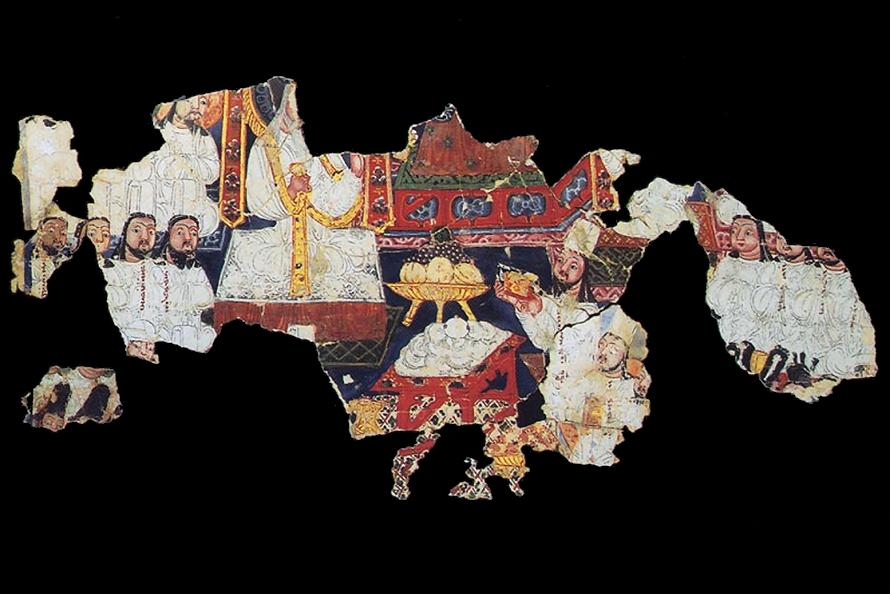
rear of the leftover page

The illustration on the back of the broken page depicts the Manichae religion's annual Puma festival to commemorate the martyrdom of the leader Mani. This festival is the most solemn festival of Manichaeism in the year. The believers recite hymns and prayers to commemorate Manichaeism. Since Mani was martyred in March 276 AD, this celebration is likely to be held every spring. There is a platform at the top of the screen, which may mean a "throne," covered with gorgeous and delicate tapestries. On the left side of the "throne," there is a Manichae monk wearing a white robe and a golden holy band. His beard and hair are all white. He raised his left hand and held a cup in his right hand. His face and head were completely damaged. On the ground at the bottom of the screen, there is a blue carpet on the ground, and a bright red and gold table is placed on top of which is covered with sun and moon-shaped white pastries; in front of the table is a three-foot gold plate with crystal clear fruits— -Grapes, watermelons, and blanched melons, these are the favorite foods of the Manichaeans; on the left side of the case, there are two kneeling voters wearing white robes, one of whom holds a red-rimmed and gold-encrusted classic.

The background of the entire painting depicts four rows of kneeling Manichae believers, arranged in a hierarchical order. Manichaeism has a strict teaching hierarchy system, divided into five levels from top to bottom: mage (master), bishop (episcopus), elder (presbyter), voters (electi), listeners (auditores). Judging by this, the first three rows are all voters wearing white crowns and white robes, and the white robes of voters in the second row have their names written in Mani letters; the remaining portraits in the fourth row are smaller in size, Wearing a black crown should be a listener in celebration costumes.

== See also ==
- Leaf from a Manichaean book MIK III 4959
- Fragment of Manichae Manuscript
- Sgd Manichean Letters
