= Asian Art Museum =

Asian Art Museum is the usual name for a number of museums, including:

- The Asian Art Museum (San Francisco)
- The Asiatic Museum, in St. Petersburg, Russia
- The Seattle Asian Art Museum

It may also refer to:

- The Musée Cernuschi, in Paris, France, officially the Asian Arts Museum of the City of Paris
- The Guimet Museum, in Paris, France, officially the Guimet National Museum of Asian Arts
- The Museum of Asian Art in Berlin, Germany
- The Museum of Asian Art of Corfu in Corfu, Greece
- The National Museum of Asian Art, in Washington, D.C., comprises the Freer Gallery of Art and the Arthur M. Sackler Gallery

== See also ==
- List of museums of Asian art
