= Leaf from a Manichaean book MIK III 4959 =

Manichaean manuscript fragment

Fragmented pages of Manichae manuscript MIK III 4959
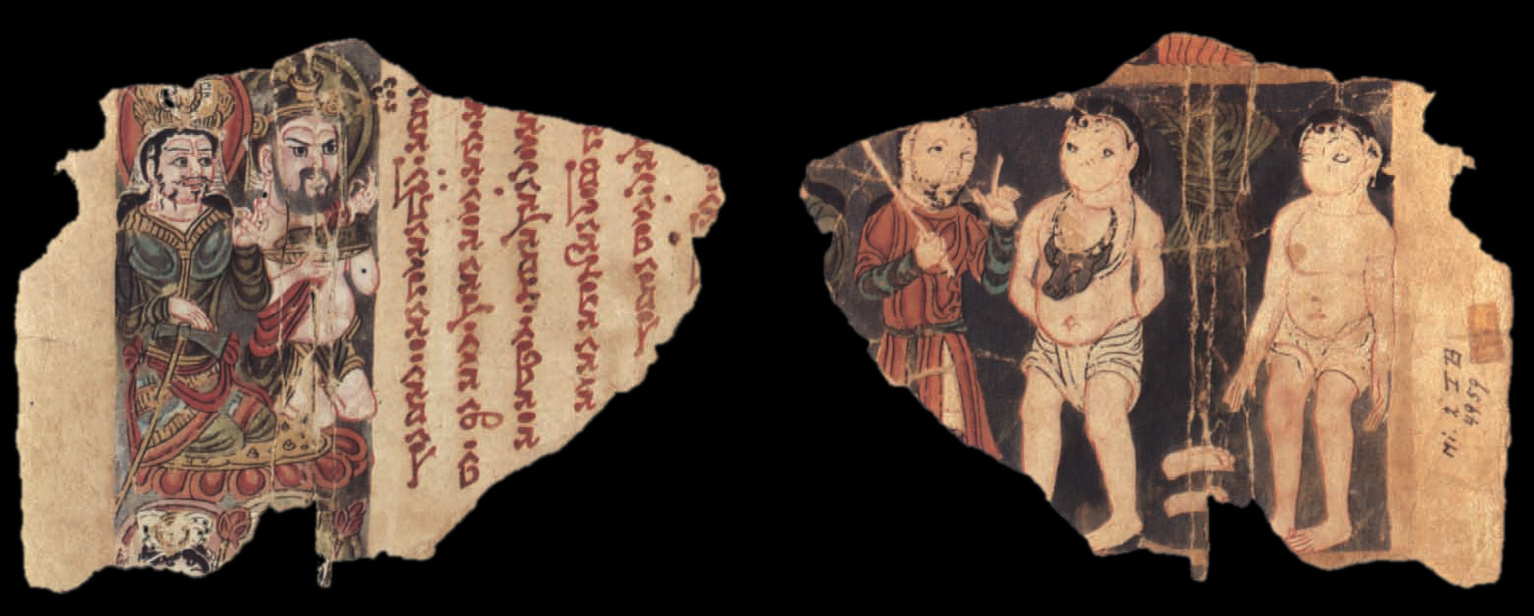
- Left: front; right: back
- Size: Length 8.2 cm, width 11.0 cm
- Created: 8-9th century
- Discovered: German Turpan expedition team at the beginning of the 20th century in Xinjiang Gaochang α ruins
- Present location: Berlin Asian Art Museum, Germany
- Identification: MIK III 4959

Leaf from a Manichaean book MIK III 4959 is a fragment of Manichaean manuscripts collected in Germany Berlin Asian Art Museum, drawn during the 8th-9th centuries, Was discovered in Xinjiang by German Turpan expedition team in the early 20th century. The remaining page is 8.2 cm long and 11.0 cm wide, with slender painting illustrations on both sides.

== Description ==
=== Front ===
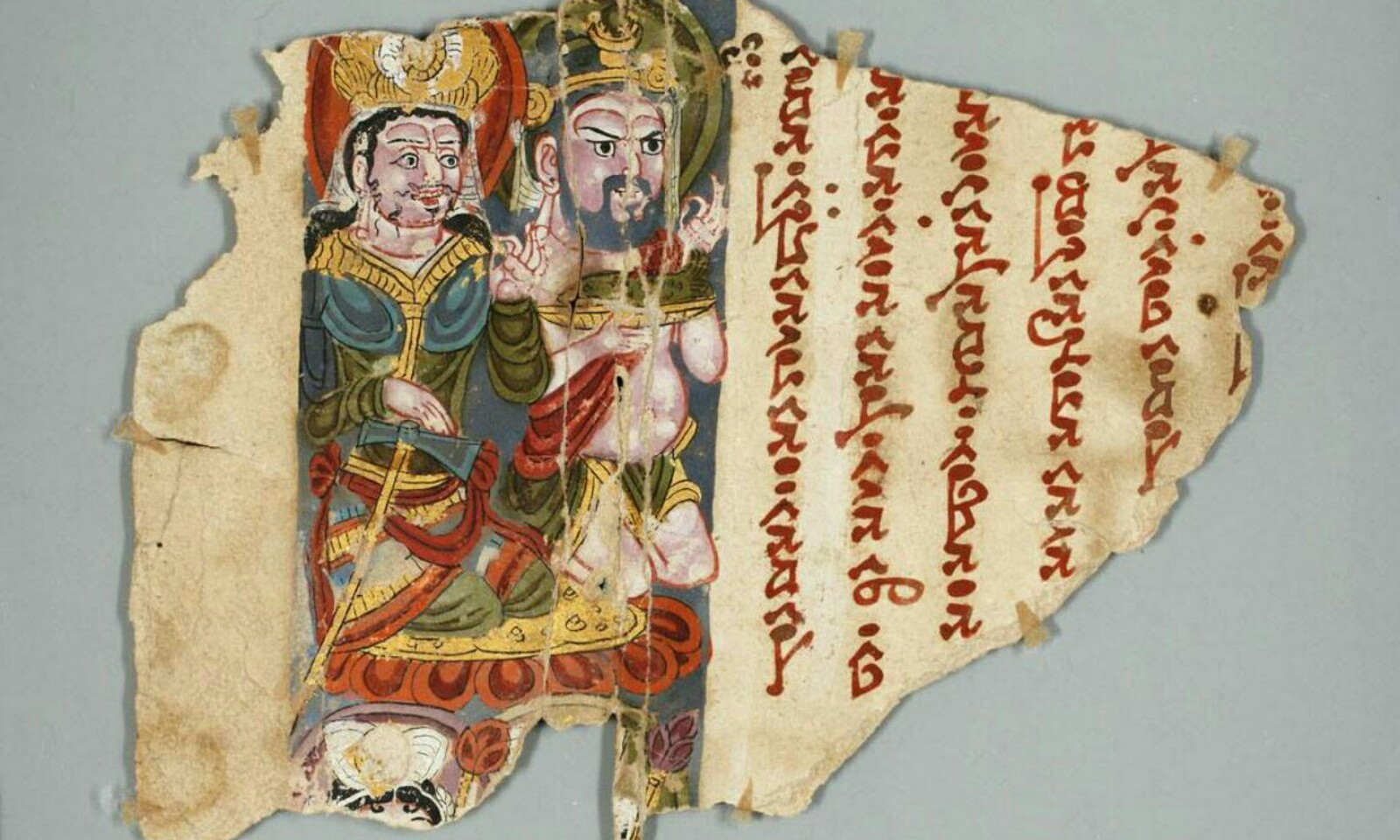
Front of the leftover page

There are six rows of text written in red letters on the right side of the front of the leftover page. The illustration on the left depicts two demons kneeling on a red and yellow lotus platform. Although the figure on the left seems to be wearing a wrinkled cloth costume, it is actually a set of exquisite hard uniforms. He put his right hand on a tomahawk and raised his left hand to speak. The eyes are big and prominent, hook nose, curly beard, and the fangs in his mouth confirm his devil status. He has a red headlight on the back of his head, with long black hair draped over his shoulders, wearing a white turban and a gorgeous golden crown, topped with feathers. Compared to the lean figure on the left, the one on the right is fat. He is naked, with only a gold and green waistcloth tied around his waist, and a red belt diagonally over his left shoulder. He held up a golden plate with a green strange fish in it with his right hand; he held it up with his left hand to speak. The back of his head has a green head, dark gray hair and a thick beard are connected by the sideburns, and the crescent sun wheel decoration can be seen on the ring-shaped golden crown. The wide-open eyes conveyed the intimidation and sinister meaning, confirming his identity as a devil.

Below the devil's image can be seen two remaining purplish-red headlights, part of the hair, and headdresses, which may be two gods, and the three-petal flower sticks in their hands are also clearly visible.

=== Back ===
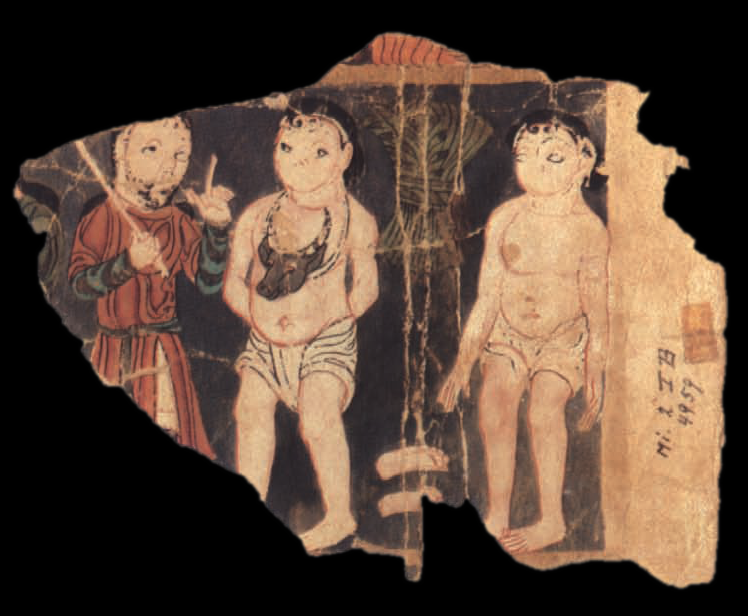
rear of the remaining page

There is only one illustration on the back of the broken page, which is incomplete. On the right side of the illustration stands a naked man with only a white loincloth around his waist. He spread his hands drooping, his whole body tilted back slightly, conveying a feeling of nervousness. There are two footprints on the ground in the middle of the picture, and there is a bunch of green grass above the footprints. Standing on the left side of the grass bundle is a man with his hands tied behind his back. He is also naked, wearing only a waistcloth and a bull's head on his chest. On the far left of the screen, a man in a red robe looks at each other with his hands tied up. The man in the red robe holds a white stick in his right hand and raises his exaggerated index finger with his left hand, which seems to be in the same hands. The bound man talks. Judging from the overall image characteristics, the posture of the man in the red robe conveys a warning or admonition.

Hungary Religious historian and Mani-teacher Gábor Kósa pointed out that the German religious scholar Hans-Joachim Klimkeit first proposed this illustration The description should be a trial scene, in which the man in the red robe is a judge. This view was accepted by the Hungarian Asian religious art historian Zsuzsanna Gulácsi, but she made a new interpretation of some details. Kang Gaobao also compared this illustration with the trial scene in Sermon on Mani's Teaching of Salvation They all portrayed the same theme-two naked men were on trial before a judge.

== See also ==
- Leaf from a Manichaean book MIK III 4979
