= List of collections of Japanese art =

Japanese art is collected by museums, galleries and private collectors in many countries around the world.

Country	City	Institution	Collection size	Notes	Official web site	Ref.
Australia	Sydney	Art Gallery of New South Wales	1,561			
Canada	Ontario	Royal Ontario Museum	10,000	Most items are from Edo period		
Germany	Neuss	Langen Foundation	350			
Israel	Haifa	Tikotin Museum of Japanese Art	8,500	17th to 19th century		
Japan	Kitakyushu	Kitakyushu Municipal Museum of Art	7,500			
Japan	Kyoto	Kyoto National Museum	8,000+	Art, archaeology, Buddhist art, and history		
Japan	Nagoya	Aichi Prefectural Museum of Art	1,000			
Japan	Nagoya	Nagoya City Museum				
Japan	Nara	Nara National Museum	1,200	Art, archaeology, Buddhist art, and history		
Japan	Osaka	Museum of Oriental Ceramics, Osaka		Ceramics and pottery		
Japan	Tokyo	National Museum of Modern Art, Tokyo				
Japan	Tokyo	Suntory Museum of Art				
Japan	Tokyo	Tokyo National Museum		Art, archaeology and history		
Japan	Tokyo	Yamatane Museum	1,800			
Japan	Osaka	National Museum of Art, Osaka	8,200 (As of February 2022)	Modern art		
Japan	Tokyo	Sumida Hokusai Museum		Ukiyoe prints; P. Morse collection, M. Narashige collection		
Poland	Kraków	Manggha Museum of Japanese Art and Technology				
United Kingdom	London	British Museum	c.26,000			
United Kingdom	London	Nasser D. Khalili Collection of Japanese Art	1,600	Decorative arts of the Meiji era		
United Kingdom	London	Victoria and Albert Museum	30,000+	Mostly from Edo and Meiji periods		
United Kingdom	Maidstone	Maidstone Museum	4,000	Edo and Meiji-period decorative arts		
United Kingdom	Oxford	Ashmolean Museum				
(United States) USA		Feinberg Collection	300			
(United States) USA		Manyo'an Collection of Japanese Art		Hosted by the Gitter-Yelen Art Study Center		
(United States) USA	Bartlesville, Oklahoma	Price Collection		Arts of the Edo period		
(United States) USA	Boston	Museum of Fine Arts	c.100,000	Largest collection outside Japan, includes the Leonard A. Lauder collection of more than 20,000 postcards		
(United States) USA	Cleveland	Cleveland Museum of Art	1,950			
(United States) USA	Eugene, Oregon	Jordan Schnitzer Museum of Art	3,000+	Mainly Edo period prints		
(United States) USA	Los Angeles	Pavilion for Japanese Art, Los Angeles County Museum of Art				
(United States) USA	Newark, New Jersey	The Newark Museum of Art	7,000	Concentrated in Edo, Meiji and Showa periods		
(United States) USA	New York	Ronin Gallery		17th – 21st century woodblock prints		
(United States) USA	New York	Metropolitan Museum of Art	17,000			
(United States) USA	Washington, D.C.	Library of Congress	2,500	Woodblock prints and drawings, 17th to 20th centuries		
(United States) USA	Washington, D.C.	National Museum of Asian Art (Freer/Sackler)				

== See also ==
- List of museums of Asian art
- List of museums
