= Sumida Hokusai Museum =

- すみだ北斎美術館
- Location within Tokyo
- Established: November 22, 2016
- Location: 2-7-2 Kamezawa, Sumida-ku, Tokyo, Japan
- Coordinates: 35.6951°N 139.7981°E
- Type: Art museum
- Key holdings: Works by Katsushika Hokusai
- Architect: Kazuyo Sejima (SANAA)
- Website: hokusai-museum.jp

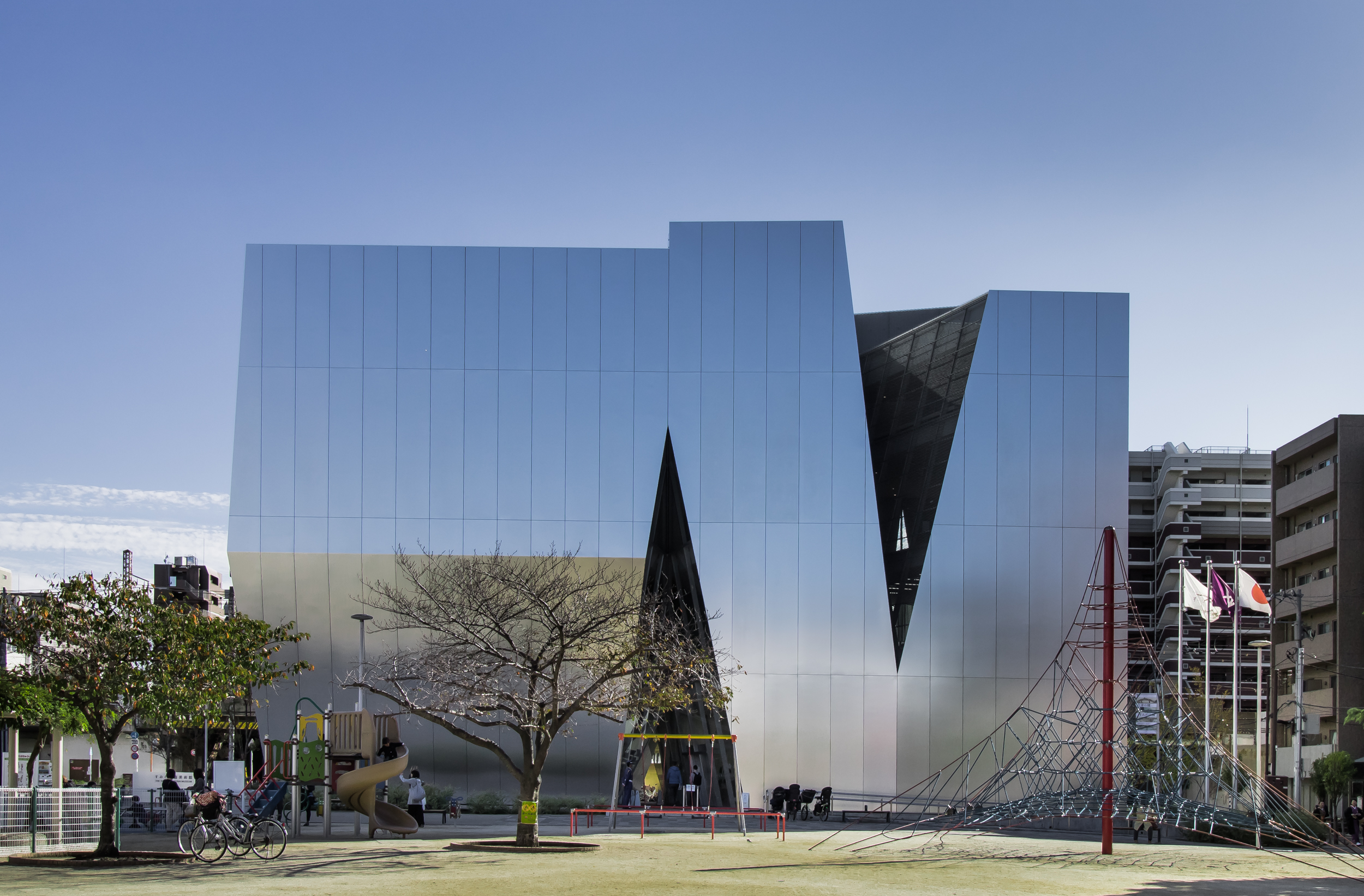
Sumida Hokusai Museum

The Sumida Hokusai Museum (Japanese: すみだ北斎美術館, Sumida Hokusai Bijutsukan) is an art museum in Sumida Ward, Tokyo, Japan, dedicated to the ukiyo-e artist Katsushika Hokusai (1760–1849). The museum opened on November 22, 2016, and includes more than 1,800 Hokusai-related items, including paintings, sketches, woodblock prints, and personal artifacts.

The building was designed by Pritzker Prize-winning architect Kazuyo Sejima.

== History ==
The Sumida Hokusai Museum was established to honor Katsushika Hokusai, who was born and spent most of his life in the Sumida area. The museum was developed by the local Sumida Ward government and opened on November 22, 2016, near Hokusai Dori, a street named in the artist's memory.

The location was once part of the daimyō residence of the Tsugaru clan during the Edo period. Local tradition states that Hokusai once painted a folding screen for the clan at this site.

== Architecture ==
The building, designed by Kazuyo Sejima, features five interlocking volumes clad in reflective aluminum panels.

== Publications ==
The museum has published a number of books about its collection and special exhibitions.
