= Museum of Oriental Art =

Museum of Oriental Art may refer to:

- State Museum of Oriental Art, a museum in Moscow
- Museum of Oriental Art (Turin), a museum in Turin
- National Museum of Oriental Art, a museum in Rome
- Museum of Oriental Art "Bratko", a museum in Korçë
- Museum of Western and Oriental Art, a museum in Kyiv
- Durham University Oriental Museum, a museum in Durham
- Edoardo Chiossone Museum of Oriental Art, a museum in Genoa
