= List of museums of Asian art =

This is a list of museums with major collections of Asian art.

Name	Country	City	Collection size	Notes
Ackland Art Museum	United States	Chapel Hill, North Carolina		
American Museum of Natural History	United States	New York, New York	60,000	
Art Gallery of New South Wales	Australia	Sydney, New South Wales		
Art Gallery of South Australia	Australia	Adelaide, South Australia		
Art Institute of Chicago	United States	Chicago, Illinois	35,000	
Arthur M. Sackler Museum	United States	Cambridge, Massachusetts	16,000	
Asia and Pacific Museum	Poland	Warsaw		
Asian Art Museum of San Francisco	United States	San Francisco, California	18,000	
Asian Civilisations Museum	Singapore			
Belz Museum of Asian and Judaic Art	United States	Memphis, Tennessee	1,000	
Birmingham Museum of Art	United States	Birmingham, Alabama	4,000	
British Museum	United Kingdom	London	55,000	
Brooklyn Museum	United States	Brooklyn, New York	20,000	
Chinese Museum (Fontainebleau)	France	Fontainebleau		
Cleveland Museum of Art	United States	Cleveland, Ohio		China, Japan, Korea
Crow Museum of Asian Art	United States	Dallas, Texas	4,000	
Field Museum of Natural History	United States	Chicago, Illinois	50,000	
Freer Gallery of Art / Arthur M. Sackler Gallery	United States	Washington, District of Columbia	40,000	
Georges Labit Museum	France	Toulouse		
Honolulu Museum of Art	United States	Honolulu, Hawaii	40,000	
Jacques Marchais Museum of Tibetan Art	United States	New York, New York		
Linden Museum	Germany	Stuttgart		
Los Angeles County Museum of Art	United States	Los Angeles, California		
Metropolitan Museum of Art	United States	New York, New York	60,000	
Minneapolis Institute of Art	United States	Minneapolis, Minnesota		
Montreal Museum of Fine Arts	Canada	Montreal, Quebec		
Musée Cernuschi	France	Paris		
Musée d'Ennery	France	Paris		China, Japan
Musée du Quai Branly – Jacques Chirac	France	Paris	58,000	
Musée Guimet	France	Paris	50,000	
Edoardo Chiossone Museum of Oriental Art	Italy	Genoa		
Museo d'arte cinese ed etnografico	Italy	Parma		
Museo d'Arte Orientale Ca Pesaro	Italy	Venice		
Museum der Völker	Austria	Schwaz		
Museum Five Continents	Germany	Munich		
Museum of Asian Art	Germany	Berlin	20,000	
Museum of East Asian Art (Cologne)	Germany	Cologne		
Museum of Ethnology, Vienna	Austria	Vienna		
Museum of Fine Arts, Boston	United States	Boston, Massachusetts	100,000	
Museum of Oriental Art (Turin)	Italy	Turin		
Museums of the Far East	Belgium	Brussels		
National Gallery of Australia	Australia	Canberra		
National Gallery of Canada	Canada	Ottawa, Ontario		India
National Museum of China	China	Beijing	1,050,000	China
National Museum of Korea	South Korea	Seoul	150,000	Korea
National Museum of Oriental Art	Italy	Rome		
National Palace Museum	Taiwan	Taipei	700,000	China
Nelson-Atkins Museum of Art	United States	Kansas City, Missouri	10,450	
Palace Museum	China	Beijing	1,800,000	China
Peabody Essex Museum	United States	Salem, Massachusetts		
Penn Museum	United States	Philadelphia, Pennsylvania		China, Japan
Rhode Island School of Design Museum	United States	Providence, Rhode Island		India, Japan
Royal Ontario Museum	Canada	Toronto, Ontario		China, Japan, Korea
Rubin Museum of Art	United States	New York, New York		Himalayas
Seattle Asian Art Museum	United States	Seattle, Washington		
Shanghai Museum	China	Shanghai	120,000	China
Tikotin Museum of Japanese Art	Israel	Haifa		
Tokyo National Museum	Japan	Tokyo	120,000	Japan
Victoria & Albert Museum	United Kingdom	London	130,000	
Vancouver Art Gallery	Canada	Vancouver, British Columbia		

Some collecting institutions combine their ethnographic, cultural, and artistic materials together in their total holdings. Such is the case of the British Museum, for example. It would be nearly impossible to distinguish between these types of objects (e.g. "fine arts") in developing a quantitative, as opposed to qualitative, ranking of this kind.

== See also ==
- List of collections of Japanese art
- List of museums
