= Museum of Asian Art =

Museum in Berlin, Germany

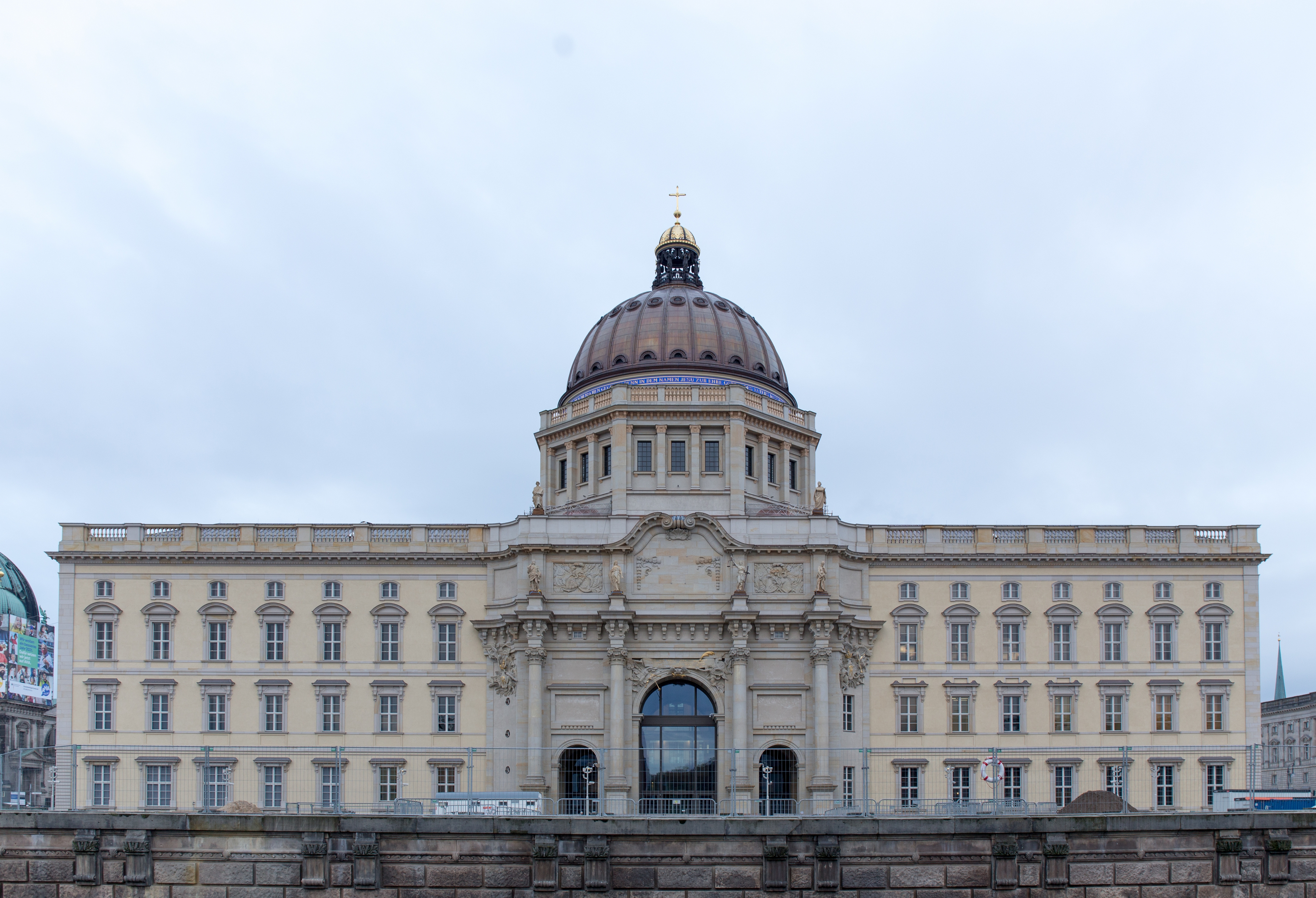
- Exterior of the museum

- Location of the Museum of Asian Art
- Established: In 2006 after merging with original Museum of East Asian Art
- Location: Berlin City Palace, Mitte, Berlin, Germany
- Coordinates: 52°31′03″N 13°24′10″E
- Type: Ethnological
- Website: Museum of Asian Art

The Museum of Asian Art (German: Museum für Asiatische Kunst) has been a part of the Humboldt Forum in Berlin since 2020. Before its relocation, the museum was sited in the neighborhood of the borough of Steglitz-Zehlendorf, Berlin, Germany. It is one of the Berlin State Museums and funded by the Prussian Cultural Heritage Foundation.

The museum houses about 20,000 Asian artifacts, making it one of the largest museums of ancient Asian art in the world. The museum is located in the same building as the Ethnological Museum of Berlin. Its geographic reach covers regions in India, Pakistan, Afghanistan, Sri Lanka, Bangladesh, Nepal, the Autonomous Region of Tibet and Xinjiang of the People's Republic of China, the Southeast Asian countries of Myanmar, Thailand, Cambodia, Vietnam, and also the Indonesian Islands or archipelago.

== History ==
The collection originally belonged to the Ethnological Museum of Berlin founded in 1873. From 1904 it was known as the "Indian Department".

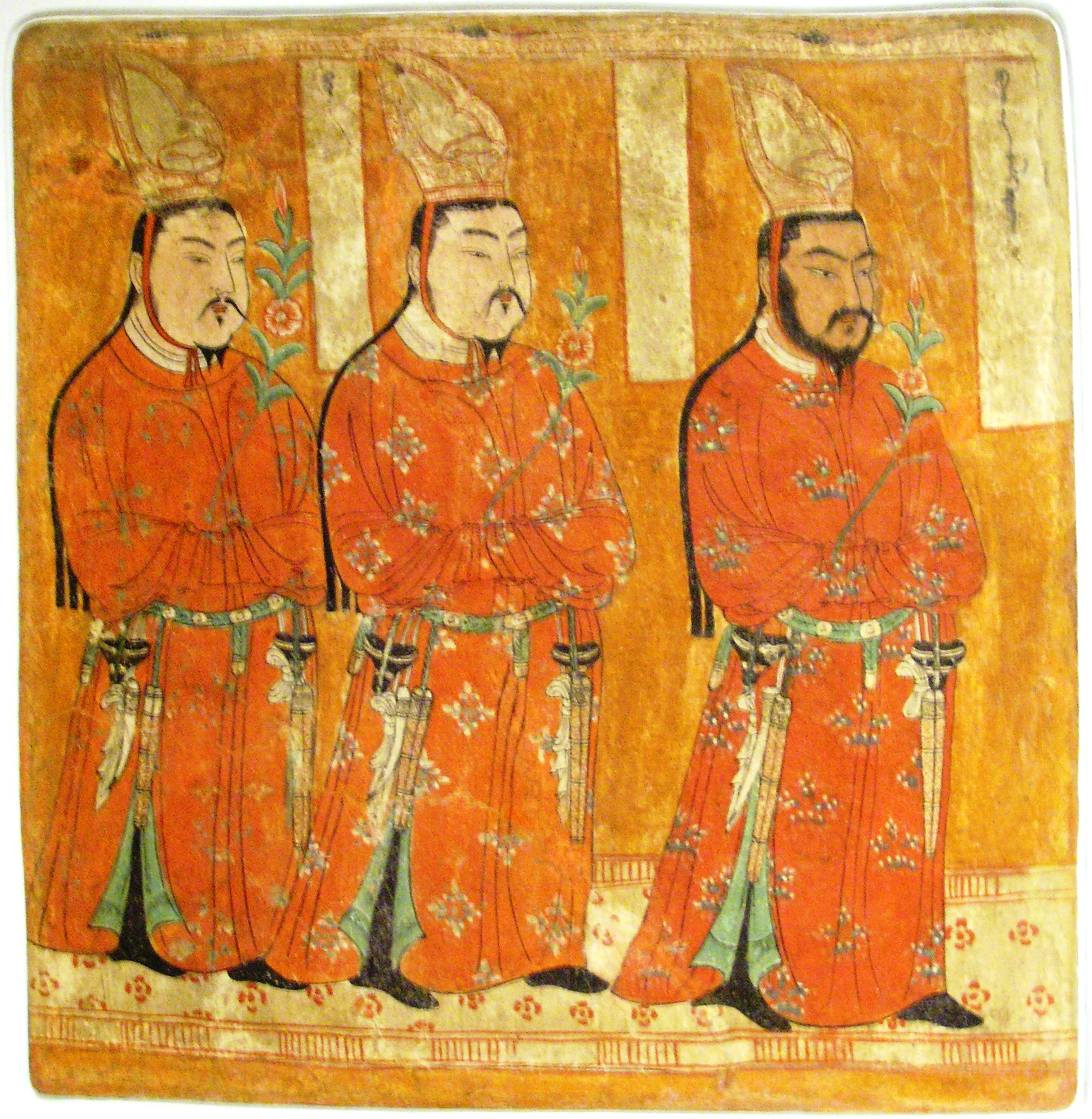
Uyghur princes wearing Chinese-styled robes and headgear. Bezeklik, Cave 9, 9th–12th century CE, wall painting, 62.4 × 59.5 cm.

On November 8, 1906, by government decree, Wilhelm von Bode, director-general of the Royal Museums of Berlin, founded the collection of the Museum of East Asian Art in Berlin. Germany's oldest museum of its kind, it was first located on Museum Island.

As a result of the four German Turfan expeditions, from 1902 to 1914, the collection was expanded to include Central Asia. In 1924, the exhibition was moved into the building belonging to the Arts and Crafts Museum, which at that time was also home to the Museum of Pre- and Early History (since 1981, it has been known as Martin-Gropius-Bau). The Society for East Asian Art founded in 1926 has provided substantial support for the museum's work. Thanks to their consistent expansion until the Second World War, the collections were among the most important in the world.

During the Second World War, there were regrettable losses, partly due to damage to the museum building and partly to the removal of a large number of artifacts to Russia. After the war, the Red Army took about 90 percent of the distributed collections to the Soviet Union as war booty. There they were taken to the Hermitage in St Petersburg where they have remained until today. Only a few pieces were returned to Berlin. The almost complete loss necessitated recreating the collection but this could only be achieved gradually. From 1952, it was the Pergamon Museum that exhibited East Asian Art. At the instigation of the first director, Herbert Härtel, the collections were presented as part of an independent "Indian Art Department", later called the "Museum of Indian Art" (from 1 January 1963 to 4 December 2006).

After the Berlin Wall went up, it was decided in 1970 to build new exhibition premises in West Berlin in the Zehlendorf district. After the fall of the Berlin Wall and German reunification, efforts were made to reorganize Berlin's museum scene. In 1992, the two separate collections were brought together in Dahlem. The Association of Friends of the Department, the Society of Indo-Asian Art Berlin eV, was founded in 1993. It publishes the annual Indo-Asiatische Zeitschrift ("Indo-Asian Journal"). In 2000, they were extended, forming until 2006 the Museum of East Asian Art, which now continues as the East Asian Art Collection at the Museum of Asian Art, since December 2006

== Collection ==
The collection covers the art of all of South Asia, Southeast Asia, and Central Asia, with special focus on sculpture (south and southeast Asia) and murals (central Asia). The artifacts date from the third millennium BC to the present day.

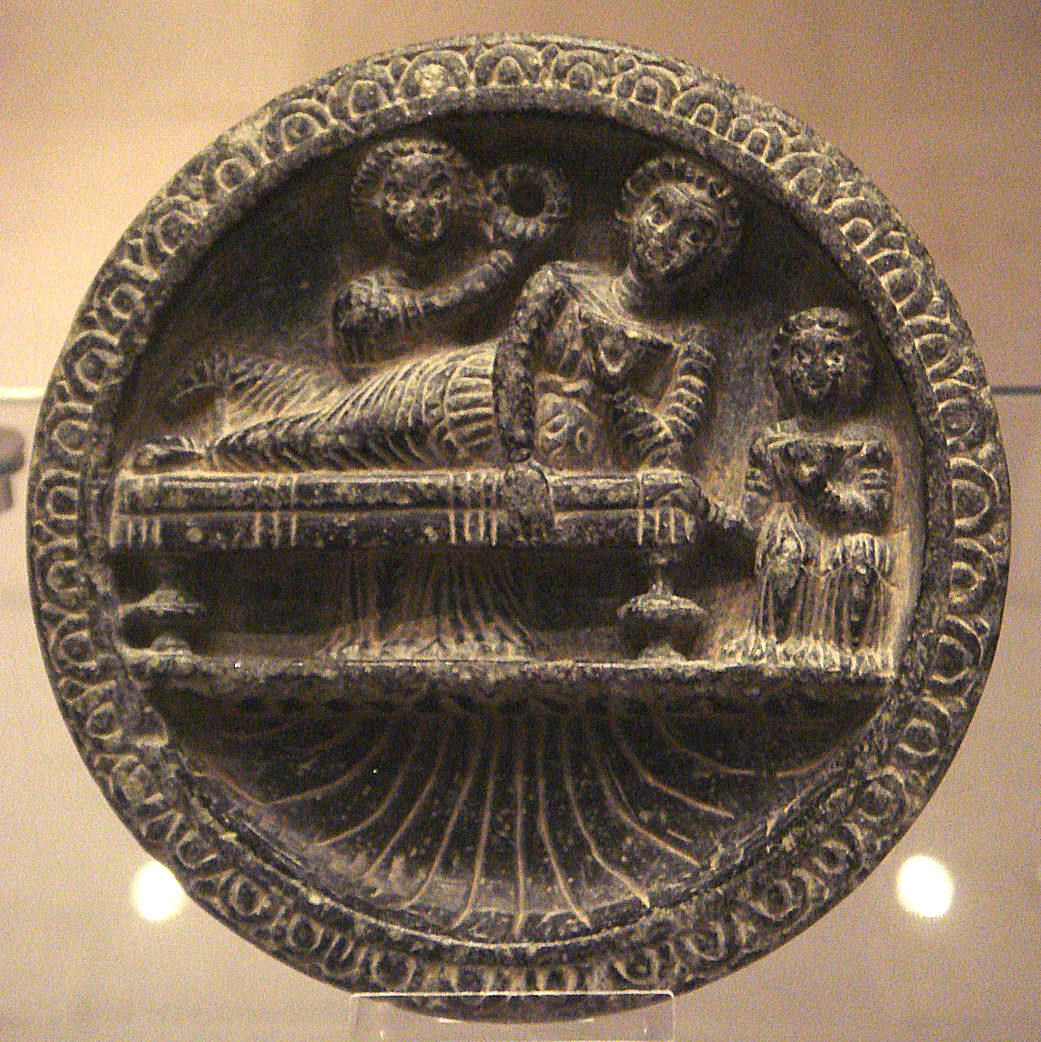
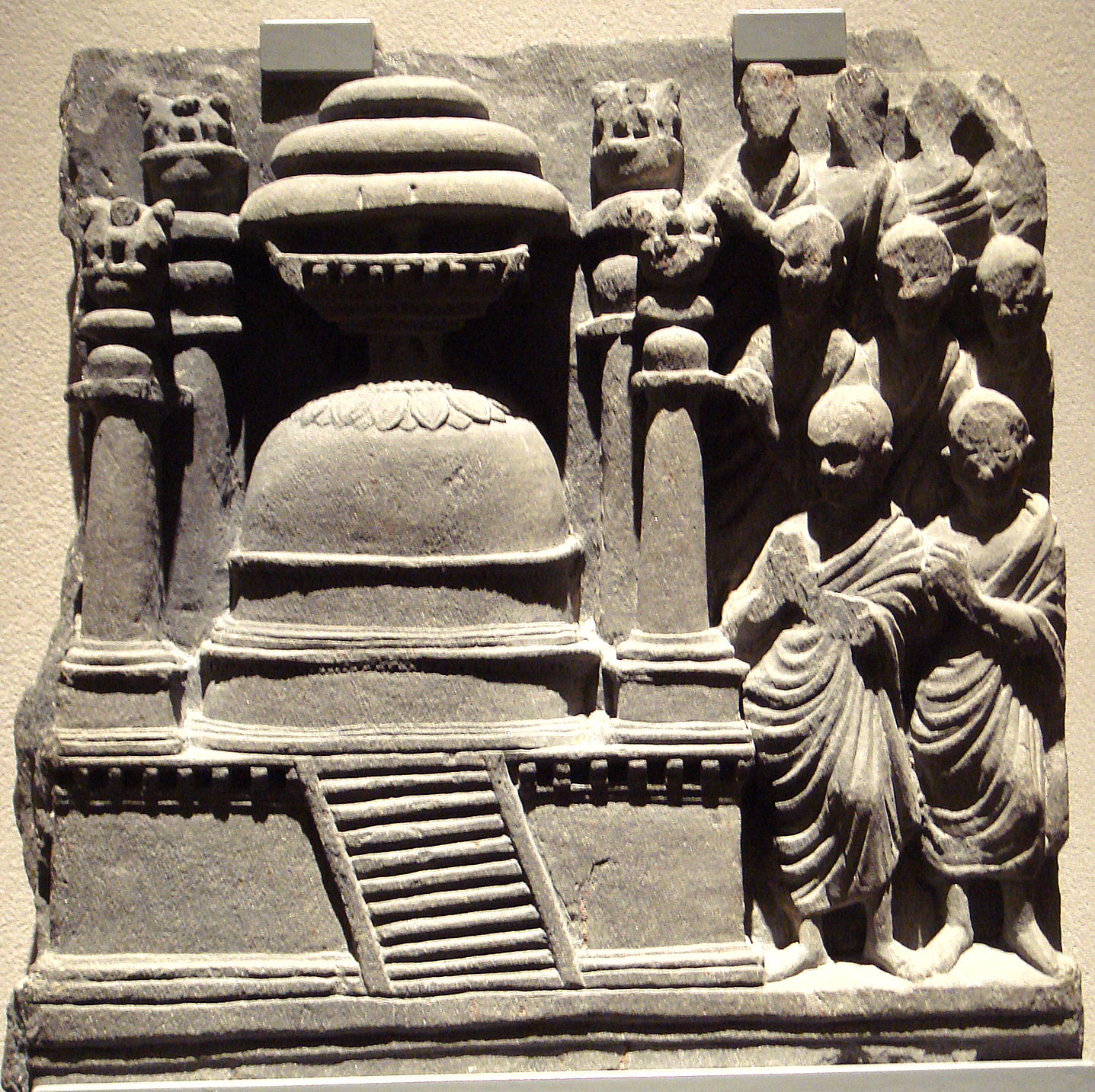
Left: Gandhara toilet tray. Right: Gandhara stupa, 2nd century CE

The permanent exhibition contains stone, bronze, stucco and ceramic sculptures and stone reliefs with Hindu, Buddhist and Jain subjects as well as murals, clay sculptures and textiles from Buddhist complexes on the northern Silk Road (now Xinjiang, China), and Indian miniatures and craftwork from the Islamic Mughal period. Sculptures of stone, bronze and wood, as well as ritual objects from Nepal, Tibet, Burma, and southeast Asia complete coverage of the Indo-Asian region. Special sections include the Gandhara Art Collection (Pakistan and Afghanistan, 1st-5th centuries) and a replica of a Central Asian Buddhist cave with a large section of the original. The Gandhara art displays include artifacts from the Swat Valley.

The museum, with an outstanding collection of some 20,000 artifacts, has example of stone sculptures, reliefs, bronze and terracotta works representative of Hinduism, Buddhism, and Jainism. Much of its collection of Jain art and Hindu sculpture dates to the classic period or the Middle Ages, and the museum also contains reconstruction of Indian temples. The East Asian Art Collection houses the largest and most important collection of Chinese, Korean and Japanese art in Germany. It consists of some 13,000 artefacts from all cultural periods, from the Neolithic to the present day. The three countries of the Asian subcontinent are first presented separately in their own departments. Their galleries converge on a central hall exhibiting the art of Buddhism, a common element in all three cultures. The Chinese Department has a large exhibition of porcelain, considerably enriched by Georg Weishaupt's collection, as well as lacquerware. Over 3,000-year-old bronzes, jades and ceramics attest to the country's early civilization and culture. A porcelain cup from the Wanli Emperor's time (1573–1620) during the Ming dynasty is of outstanding cultural and historical significance. In a separate room, a 17th-century traveling throne belonging to the Kangxi Emperor is exhibited.

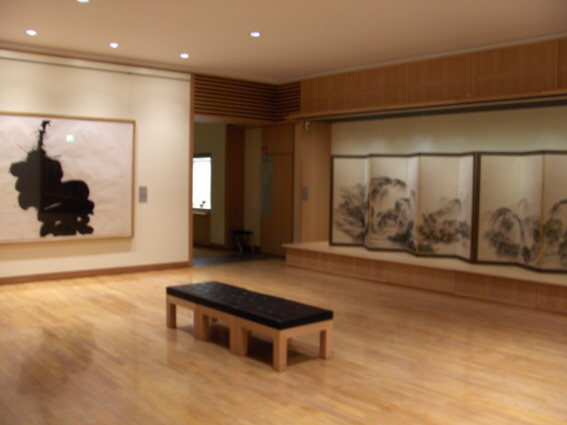
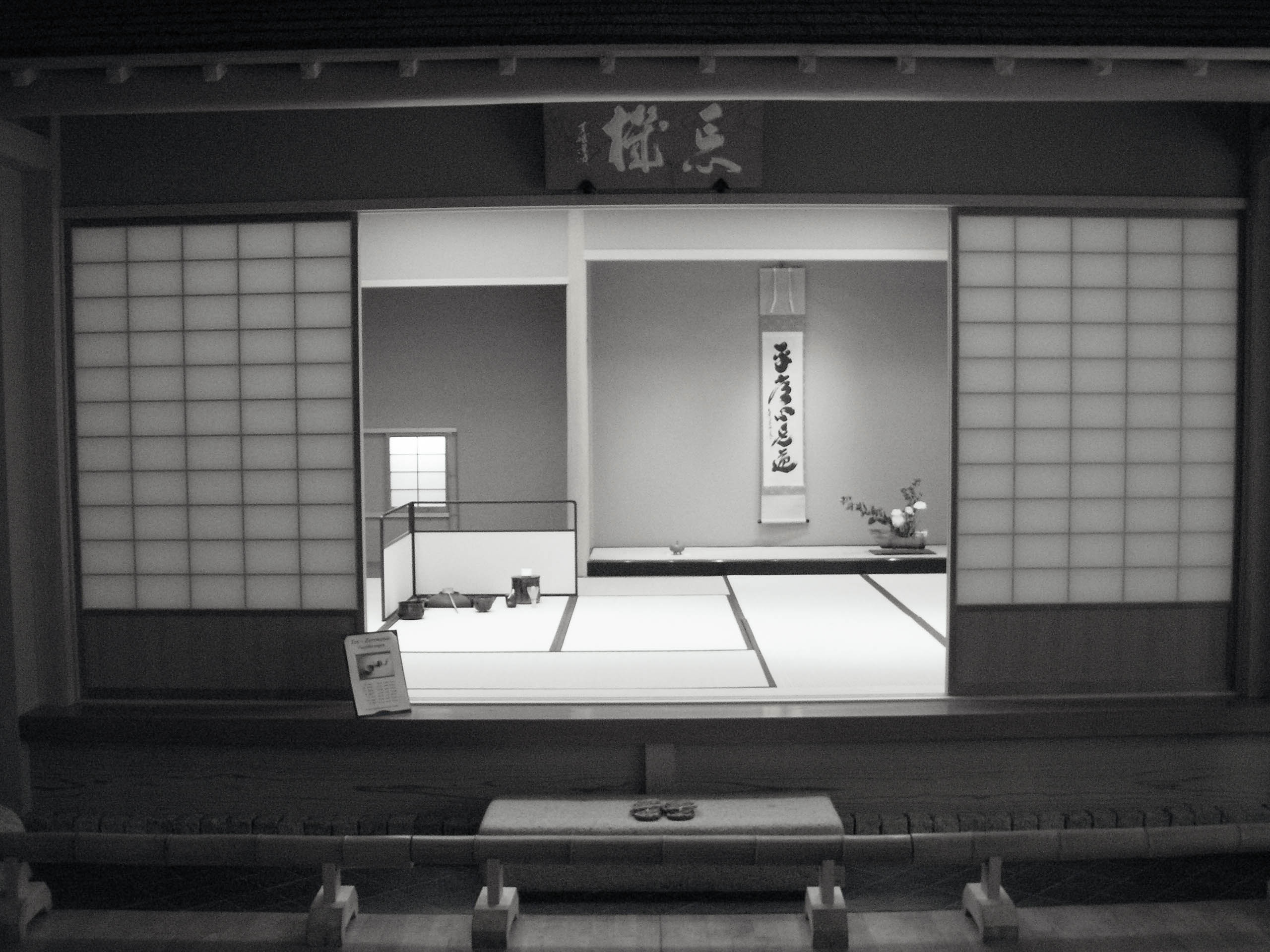
Left: Indian Room. Right: Japanese Tea House

With selected examples in its China–Japan gallery, the museum presents the art of writing, common to all areas of East Asian art. As many works of Chinese and Japanese writing and some of the old paintings are particularly sensitive to light, they are exhibited for periods of three months before being replaced. The same applies to many items of lacquerwork and textile art. However, as a result of ties with Japanese woodcuts and the museum's important graphic collection, new relationships and priorities constantly emerge. In the Japanese department, visitors are shown a Japanese tea room or Boki.

== Associations ==
A tradition of close cooperation exists with the German Society for East Asian Art, one of the museum's two supporting associations. At an international level, the museum cooperates with various non-European art museums, as well as with the Museum Rietberg in Zürich and the Musée Guimet in Paris . In the scientific field, the South, Southeast and Central Asia Collection and the East Asian Art Collection are closely connected with the neighboring Free University of Berlin. For example, museum director Willibald Veit is also Professor of East Asian Art History at the university. The merger of the two museums has been done with a future expansion plans of the "Stiftung Preußischer Kulturbesitz" and to establish the Humboldt-Forum on Schlossplatz in Berlin-Mitte, a new concept venue for unique European collections.

== Directors ==
- 1923–1934: Otto Kümmel
- 1959–1966: Roger Goepper
- 1966–1985: Beatrix von Ragué
- 1985–2009: Willibald Veit
- 2010–2018: Klaas Ruitenbeek
- since 2018: Lars-Christian Koch

== See also ==
- List of museums with major collections of Asian art
- List of museums in Berlin

== Gallery ==
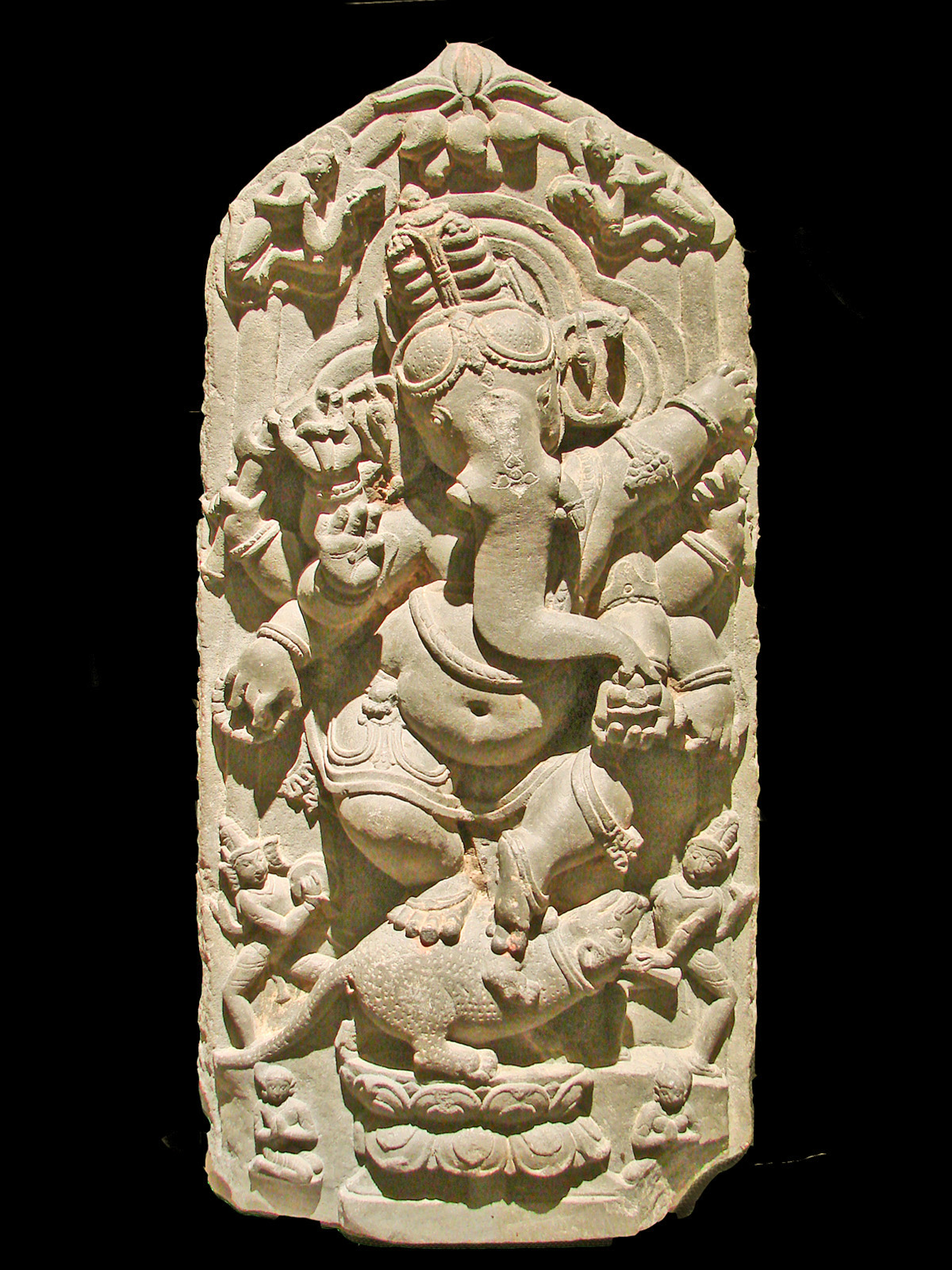
Ganesha sculpture

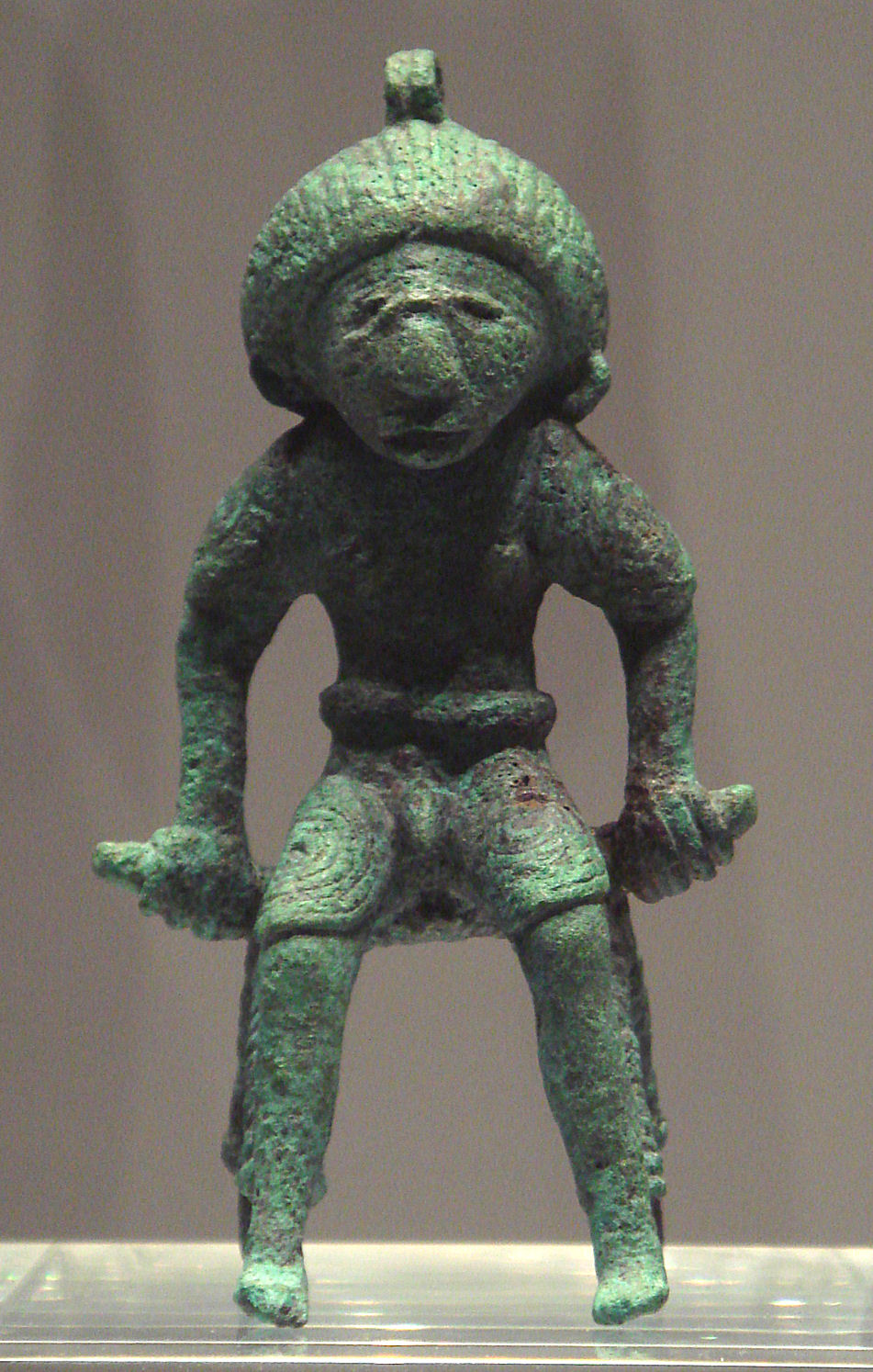
Bronze figurine, Dong Son culture

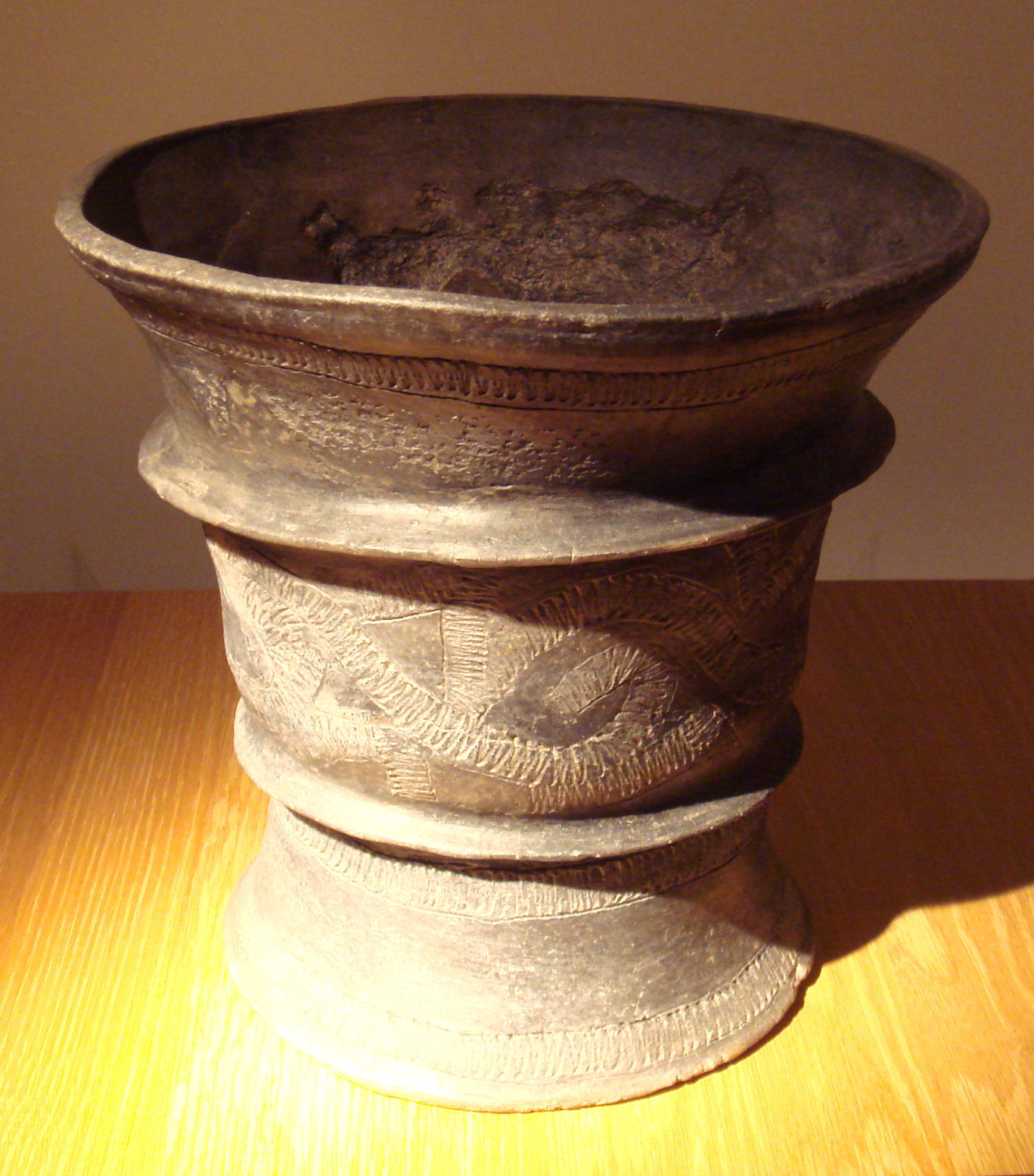
Ban Chiang vase

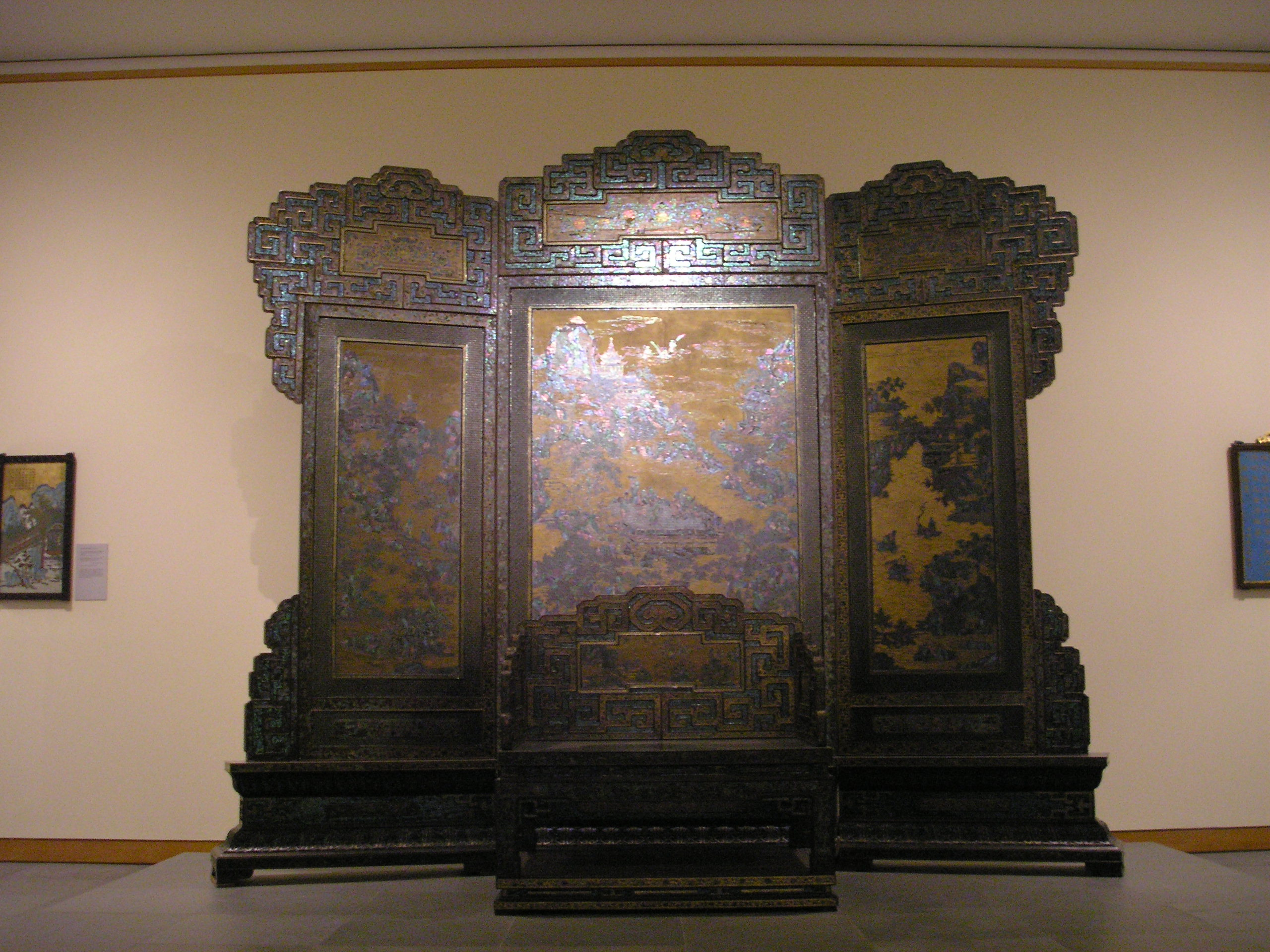
Travel throne of the Kangxi Emperor

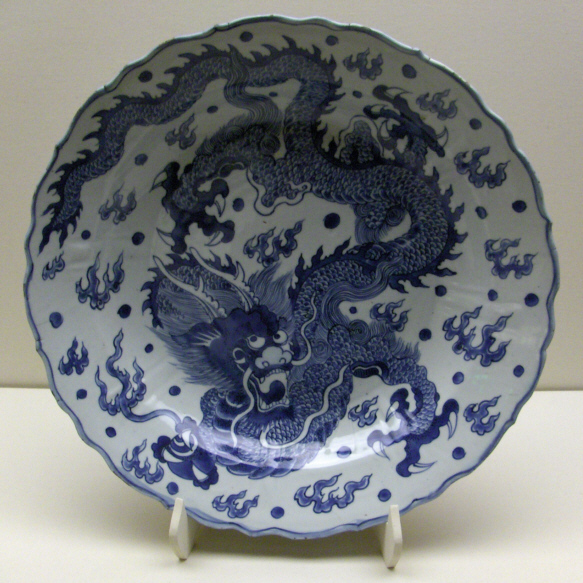
Porcelain bowl, Ming Dynasty

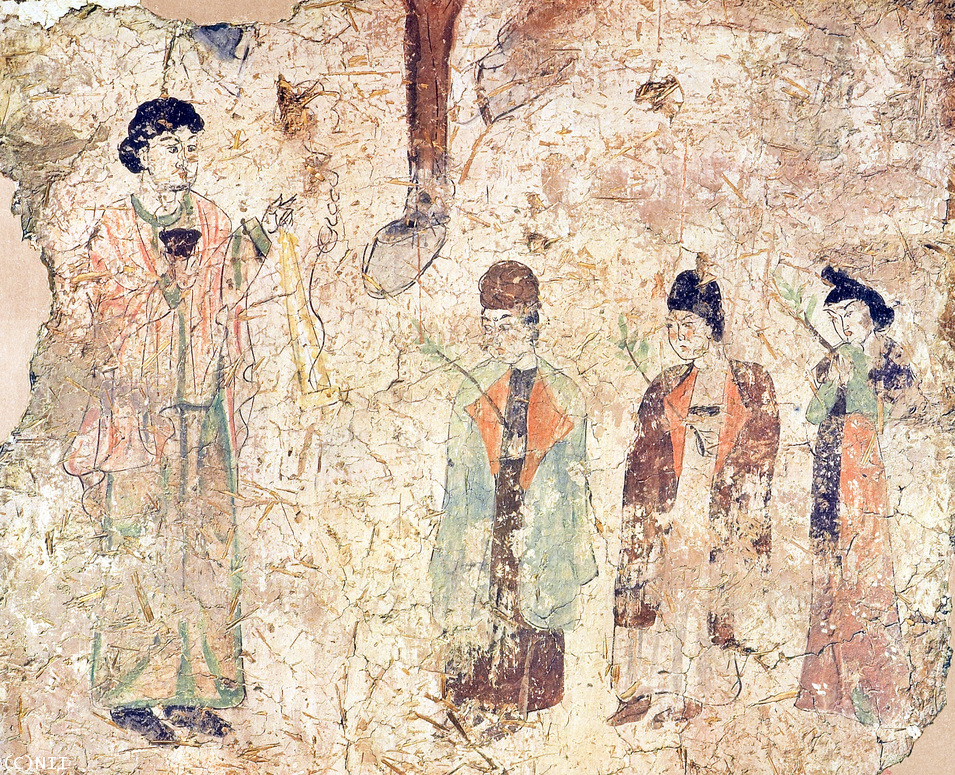
Palm Sunday, mural from the Christian Temple at Qocho

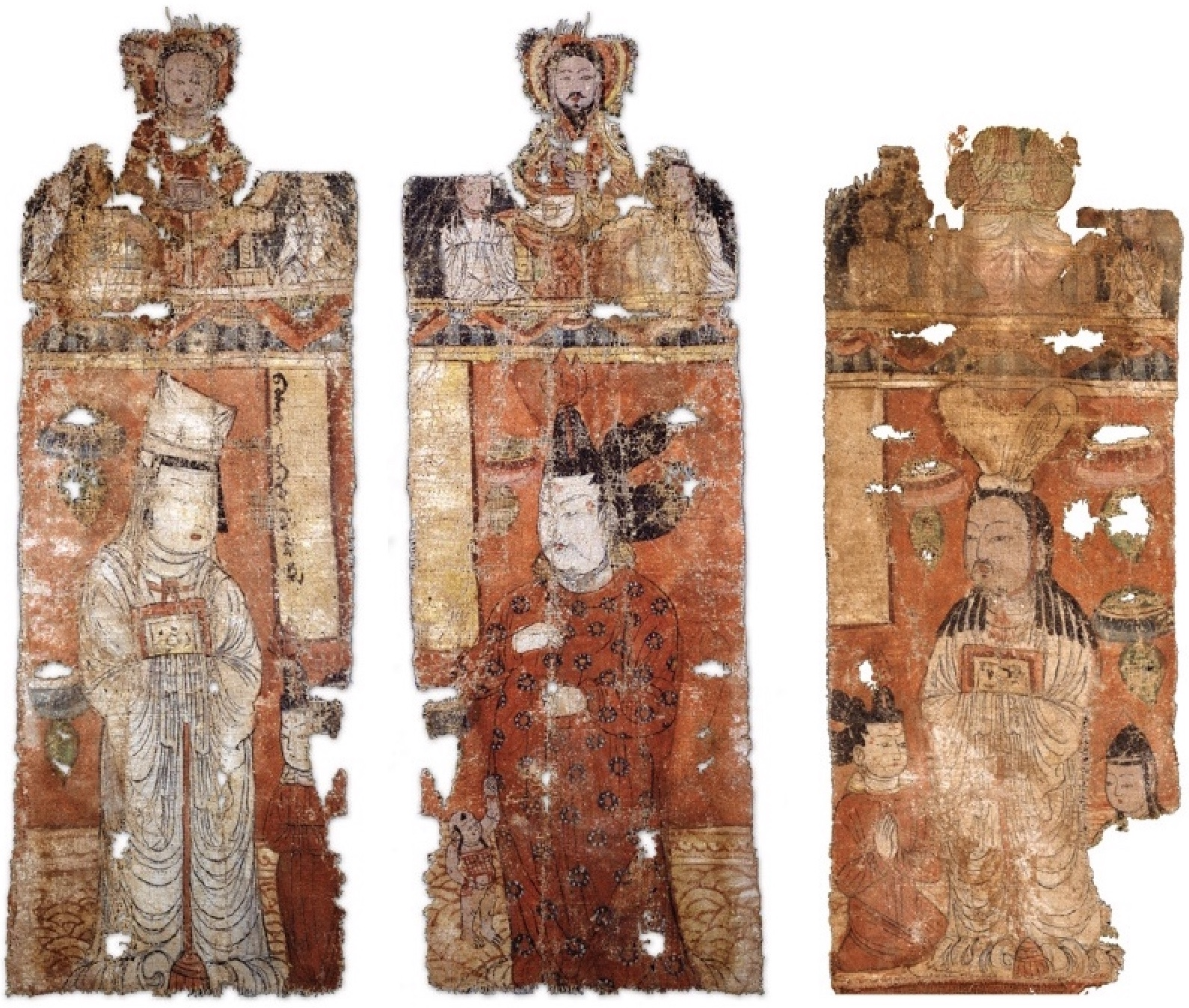
Manichaean temple banners, c. 10th century

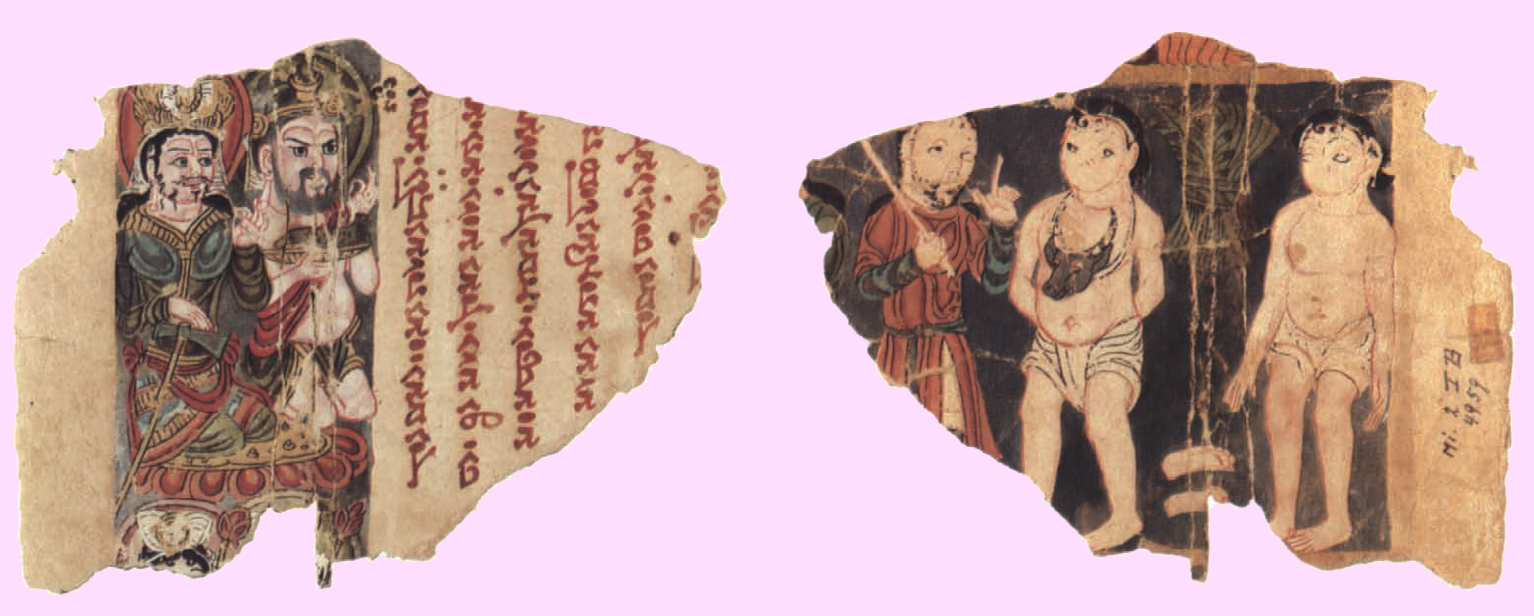
Leaf from a Manichaean book "MIK III 4959", 8th–9th century

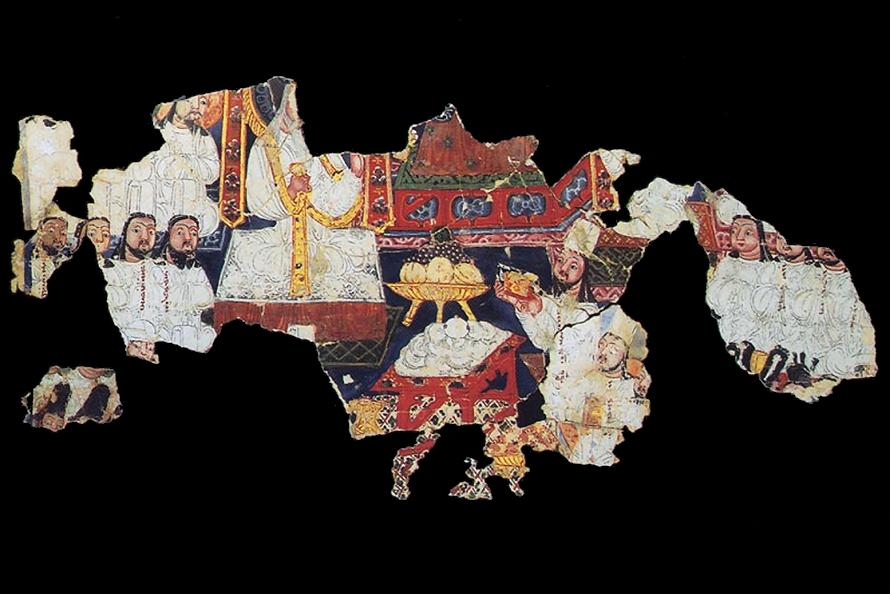
Leaf from a Manichaean book "MIK III 4979" verso, 8th–9th century

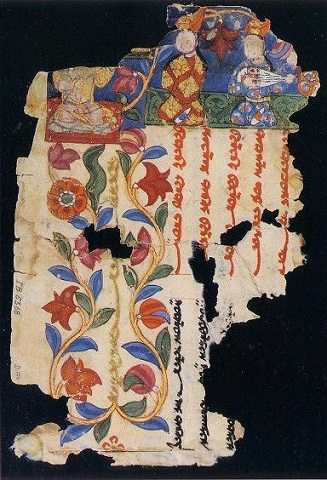
Leaf from a Manichaean book "MIK III 6368" verso, 8th–9th century
