= Indo-European vocabulary =

Proposed reconstructed word list for the Proto-Indo-European language

The following is a table of many of the most fundamental Proto-Indo-European language (PIE) words and roots, with their cognates in all of the major families of descendants.

== Notes ==
The following conventions are used:

- Cognates are in general given in the oldest well-documented language of each family, although forms in modern languages are given for families in which the older stages of the languages are poorly documented or do not differ significantly from the modern languages. In addition, modern English forms are given for comparison purposes.
- Nouns are given in their nominative case, with the genitive case supplied in parentheses when its stem differs from that of the nominative. (For some languages, especially Sanskrit, the basic stem is given in place of the nominative.)
- Verbs are given in their "dictionary form". The exact form given depends on the specific language:
  - For the Germanic languages and for Welsh, the infinitive is given.
  - For Latin, the Baltic languages, and the Slavic languages, the first-person singular present indicative is given, with the infinitive supplied in parentheses.
  - For Greek, Old Irish, Armenian and Albanian (modern), only the first-person singular present indicative is given.
  - For Sanskrit, Avestan, Old Persian, Parthian, the third-person singular present indicative is given. Where useful, Sanskrit root forms are provided using the symbol √.
  - For Tocharian, the stem is given.
  - For Hittite, either the third-person singular present indicative or the stem is given.
- In place of Latin, an Oscan or Umbrian cognate is occasionally given when no corresponding Latin cognate exists. Similarly, a cognate from another Anatolian language (e.g. Luvian, Lycian) may occasionally be given in place of or in addition to Hittite.
- For Tocharian, both the Tocharian A and Tocharian B cognates are given whenever possible.
- For the Celtic languages, both Old Irish and Welsh cognates are given when possible. For Welsh, normally the modern form is given, but occasionally the form from Old Welsh is supplied when it is known and displays important features lost in the modern form. A Middle Irish cognate is given when the Old Irish form is unknown, and Gaulish, Cornish and/or Breton (modern) cognates may occasionally be given in place of or in addition to Welsh.
- For the Baltic languages, Lithuanian (modern) and Old Prussian cognates are given when possible. (Both Lithuanian and Old Prussian are included because Lithuanian often includes information missing in Old Prussian, e.g. due to lack of written accent marks in the latter.) Similarly to the Celtic situation, Old Lithuanian forms may occasionally be given in place of modern Lithuanian; Latvian (modern) may occasionally be given in place of or in addition to Lithuanian.
- For the Slavic languages, Old Church Slavonic cognates are given when possible. Forms from modern Slavic languages or other Church Slavic dialects may occasionally be given in place of Old Church Slavonic.
- For English, a modern English cognate is given when it exists, along with the corresponding Old English form; otherwise, only an Old English form is given.
- For Gothic, a form in another Germanic language (Old Norse; Old High German; or Middle High German) is sometimes given in its place or in addition, when it reveals important features.

== Kinship ==
PIE	English	Gothic	Latin	Ancient Greek	Sanskrit	Iranian	Slavic	Baltic	Celtic	Armenian	Albanian	Tocharian	Hittite
*méh₂tēr "mother" (Note: Reflexes of the stem in daughter languages also refer to deified beings and deities within their respective mythologies/religions: Old English Mōdraniht ('Night of the Mothers'); Celtic and Germanic Matres and Matronae (Latin for 'Mothers and Matrons'); Latvian Māte ('Mother'); Gaulish Dea Matrona ('Divine Mother Goddess'); Sanskrit Matrikas ('Divine Mothers').)	mother (< OE mōdor)	mōdar "mother"	māter "mother" ⇒ (Note: maternal, maternity, matron, matrimony, matrix, matriculate, material, matter, madeira, alma mater, etc.)	mḗtēr "mother" ⇒ (Note: Dēmḗtēr Demeter; mētrópolis "metropolis, lit., mother-city")	mā́tṛ, mātar, mātā "mother"	Av mātar- "mother"; NPers mādar "mother"	OCS mati, mater- "mother"	Lith móteris "woman", motina "mother"; OPrus muti "mother"	Gaul. mātīr "mother", OIr máthir "mother"; W modryb "auntie"	mayr "mother"	motër "sister"	A mācar, B mācer "mother"	
*ph₂tḗr "father"	father (< OE fæder)	fadar "father"	pater "father" ⇒ (Note: paternal, paternity, patron, patronize, pattern, patrimony, patriot, expatriate, patrician, perpetrate, compadre, etc.)	patḗr "father" (> patriarch)	pitṛ, pitar, pitā "father"; Pitrs "spirits of the ancestors" (litt. "the fathers")	Av pitar- (nom. also pta, ta), OPers pita "father", NPers pedar/padar			OIr athair "father"; Welsh edrydd "paternal domain"	hayr "father"		A pācar, B pācer "father"	
*ǵénh₁tōr "parent"			genitor "parent" ⇒ (Note: "genitor, progenitor")	genétōr "ancestor"	janitṛ "progenitor"	Av ząθar "progenitor, the Creator"							
*bʰréh₂tēr "brother"	brother (< OE brōþor)	brōþar "brother"	frāter "brother" ⇒ (Note: fraternal, fraternity, fraternize, friar, (Note: e.g., black friar) confrere)	pʰrā́tēr "member of a phratry (brotherhood)" (> phratry)	bʰrā́tṛ, bhrātar, bhrātā "brother"; Rom phral "brother" (> pal) (Note: Phralipe, or Pralipe, "brotherhood", name of several Gypsy/Romany organizations, including a music band and a literary magazine.)	Av brātar-, OPers brātar-, NPers brādar-, Ossetian ärvád "brother, relative", NPers barādar, Kurd bira/birader	OCS bratrŭ "brother"	Lith brõlis, OPrus brati "brother"	Gaul Bratronos (pers. name); OIr bráthair, W brawd (pl. brodyr) "brother"	ełbayr (gen. ełbawr) "brother"		A pracar, B procer "brother"	Lyd brafr(-sis) "brother"
*swésōr "sister"	sister (< OE sweostor, influenced by ON systir)	swistar "sister"	soror "sister" ⇒ (Note: sorority)	éor "cousin's daughter"	svásṛ, svasar, swasā "sister"	Av x̌vaŋhar- "sister"; NPers ḫwāhar Kurd xwişk "sister"	OCS sestra "sister"	Lith sesuo, seser-, OPrus sestra "sister"	Gaul suiorebe "with two sisters" (dual) OIr siur, W chwaer "sister"	kʿuyr (kʿiṙ), nom.pl kʿor-kʿ "sister" (Note: kʿoyr *swesōr; kʿeʿ < *swesros; kʿor-kʿ < *swesŏres.)	vashë, vajzë "girl" (< *varjë < *vëharë < PAlb *swesarā)	A ṣar', B ṣer "sister"	
*somo-ph₂tōr "sibling, lit. same-father(ed)"		ON samfeðra		homopátōr		OP hamapitar-						A ṣomapacar	
*dʰugh₂tḗr "daughter"	daughter (< OE dohtor)	daúhtar "daughter" (Note: Cf. Classical Runic dohtriR 'daughters', in the Tune stone (ca. 400).)	Oscan futír "daughter"	θugátēr "daughter"; Myc tu-ka-te "daughter" (Note: Varias García (2017) pointed out that a tablet from Mycene uses "tu-ka-te", whereas tablets from Knossos, Pylos and Thebes use "ko-wa" (*korwa, later koré 'maiden, girl').)	dúhitṛ, duhitar, duhitā "daughter"	Av dugədar-, duɣδar-, NPers doḫtar "daughter" Kurd dot "daughter"	OCS dŭšti, dŭšter- "daughter"	Lith duktė, dukter-, OPrus dukti "daughter"	Gaulish duxtir "daughter"; Celtib TuaTer (duater) "daughter"	dustr "daughter"		A ckācar, B tkācer "daughter"	HLuw túwatara "daughter"; ?Lyd datro "daughter"; CLuw/Hitt duttarii̯ata-; (Note: Although this word is attested in Hittite, it is considered a loanword from Luwian. While scholarship recognizes the likelihood of its being the reflex of the root in Anatolian, its appearance in Hittite and Luwian would indicate a different meaning, however.) Lyc kbatra "daughter" (Note: The root could also be found in Anatolian languages with later attestation: Isaurian personal name Τουάτρης Touatris; Pisidian name Δωταρι Dotari. However, Simon Zsolt questions the interpretation of Dotari as a reflex, since this word is attested as a compound in male names.)
*suHnús "son" (See also *sewh₁-)	son (< OE sunu)	sunus "son"		huiós "son"	sūnú- "son"	Av hunuš "son"	OCS synŭ "son"	Lith sūnùs, OPrus suns "son"	? Celtib EBURSUNOS "son of Eburos (?)" (Note: Other interpretations are "son of the yew" or "son of the boar".) (Note: The word is attested in Plate III of the Botorrita plaques. Patrizia de Bernardo Stempel interprets "-SUNOS" as the remnant of the root in the Celtic branch.) ? Celt/Lus EQUEUNUBO (< *ek^{w}ei-sūnu-bʰos) "to the sons on the horse" (Note: This is the other possible attestation of the root in the Celtic branch.)	ustr "son"	çun "boy/son"	A se, B soyä "son"	
*putló- "son"			Osc puklo- "son"	paîs "son"	putrá- "son"	Av puθra "son" Kurd pis, put							
*(h₂)népōts "nephew, grandson"	nephew; obsolete neve "nephew, male cousin, grandson" (< OE nefa)	OHG nevo "nephew"	nepōs (nepōtis) "grandson, nephew" ⇒ (Note: nepotism)	népodes "descendants"	nápāt- "grandson, descendant"	Av napāt-, naptar-, OPers napāt-, NPers naveh-, "grandson, descendant"; Kurd nevî "grandchild"	OCS netii "nephew"	OLith nepotis, OPrus neputs "grandson"	OIr nïa "sister's son", W nai "nephew"		nip "grandson, nephew"		
*(h₂)néptih₂ "granddaughter, niece"	niece; obsolete nift "niece" (< OE nift)	OHG nift "niece"	neptis "granddaughter"		naptī́ "granddaughter"				OIr necht "niece", W nith "niece"				
*dayh₂wḗr "husband's brother, brother-in-law"	OE tācor "husband's brother"	OHG zeihhor "husband's brother"	levir "husband's brother"	dāēr "husband's brother"	devṛ́, devará "husband's brother"	Past lewar "brother-in-law"	OCS děverĭ "brother-in-law"	Lith dieveris "husband's brother"	W daw(f) "brother-in-law"	taygr, tekʿr "husband's brother"			
*snusós "daughter-in-law"	OE snoru "daughter-in-law"	OHG snur "daughter-in-law"	nurus "daughter-in-law"	nuós "daughter-in-law"	snuṣā- "daughter-in-law"	Old Ir. *(s)nušáh Bactrian ασνωυο (asnōuo) NPers. sunoh / sunhār "daughter-in-law"	OCS snŭxa "daughter-in-law"			nu "daughter-in-law"	nuse "bride"	B santse "daughter-in-law" (Note: As argued by Peyrot and Meng (2021).)	
*wedʰ- "pledge, bind, secure, lead"	wed (< OE weddian "to pledge, wed")				vadhū́ "bride"		OCS voditi "to lead"		W gwedd "yoke"				
*swéḱuros "father-in-law"	OE swēor "father-in-law"	swaihra "father-in-law"	socer "father-in-law"	hekurós "father-in-law"	śváśura "father-in-law"	Av xᵛasura "father-in-law"; Kurdish xwesûr	OCS svekrŭ "father-in-law"	Lith šešuras "father-in-law"		skesrayr "father-in-law"	vjehërr "father-in-law"		
*sweḱrúh₂ "mother-in-law"	OE sweger "mother-in-law"	swaihro "mother-in-law"	socrus "mother-in-law"	hekurá "mother-in-law"	śvaśrū́- "mother-in-law"	Past xwāše "mother-in-law" Kurdish xwesû	OCS svekry "mother-in-law"	OPrus swasri "mother-in-law"	W chwegr "mother-in-law"	skesur "mother-in-law"	vjehrrë "mother-in-law"		
*h₂éwh₂os "maternal grandfather, maternal uncle"		awō "grandmother"	avus "grandfather"; avunculus "maternal uncle" ⇒ (Note: avuncular)				Rus uj, vuj "uncle" (obsolete); Ukr vuyko "maternal uncle"	Lith avynas "maternal uncle", OPrus awis "uncle"	W ewythr, MBre eontr, MCo eviter "maternal uncle" (< PCelt awon-tīr "uncle"); OIr aue "descendant, grandchild"	OArm haw "grandfather"		B āwe "grandfather"	ḫuḫḫa-, Lyc χuga- "grandfather"; CLuw ḫu-u-ḫa-ti "grandfather" (abl.-ins.)
*yemH- "twin; to hold"		ON Ymir	geminus "twin"; Remus "twin, Remus"		yáma- "twin; first man to die"	Av Yema			OIr emon, Gaul Iemurioi "twin?"				
*h₁widʰéwh₂ "widow" < *h₁weydʰh₁- "to separate" (Note: cf. divide)	widow (< OE widwe)	widuwō "widow"	vidua "widow"	ēḯtheos "widow"	vidhávā "widow"	viδauua "widow"	OCS vŭdova "widow"	OP widdewū "widow"	OI fedb "widow"; W gweddw "widow, widower"		vejë "widow"		

== People ==
PIE	English	Gothic	Latin	Ancient Greek	Sanskrit	Iranian	Slavic	Baltic	Celtic	Armenian	Albanian	Tocharian	Hittite
*mon- "human beings"	man (< OE "Mann")	manna "human beings"		Amazon < *n̥-mn̥-g^{(w)}-iōn 'man-less, without husband' (debatable)	manuṣya "human being"	Av manuš "human" NPers maneš "human habitude"	OES/OCS mǫžĭ "man"			mard "man"			
*dʰǵʰmṓ "person, human (litt. of the earth)" (See also *dʰeǵʰom-)	Scots gome "person, man", OE brȳdguma "bridegroom" (Note: bridegome in Middle English, subsequently influenced by groom (archaically "servant, man").)< *dʰǵʰm̥mṓ	guma "man" < *dʰǵʰm̥mṓ	homō "person" ⇒ (Note: human, humanity, ad hominem, etc)< *dʰǵʰm̥mṓ					OLith žmuõ "person"; Lith žmoná "wife"; OPrus zmunents "human"					
*h₂ner- "man, hero"		ON Njǫrðr (name of a God)	Ner-ō (personal name), neriōsus "strong"	anḗr (andros) "man" (> Andreas, Andrew)	nár- (nom. nā) "man, person"	Av nar- (nom. nā) "man, person",Past nar "male, brave" NPers nar-, Kurd nêr "male animal, masculine"	OCS naravŭ "character, custom";	possibly Lith nóras "wish, want", narsa; narsùs "brave;" OPrus nàrs "courage"	W nêr "lord, prince, leader; hero"; Celt narto "strength"	ayr (aṙn) "man, person"	njer "man, person"		
*wiHrós "man"	werewolf (< OE wer "man")	waír "man"	vir "man" ⇒ (Note: virile, virtue, triumvir(ate), etc. (Note: But not virus))	hiérāx "a type of hawk"	vīrá- "man, hero"	Av vīra- "man, hero", Kurd mêr	OCS vira "wergeld"?	Lith výras "man"; OPrus wirs "man, husband"	OIr fer, W gŵr "man"	heros "hero"	burrë "man"	A wir "young"	
*gʷḗn "woman, wife"	queen (< OE cwēn "queen, woman, wife")	qēns (qēnáis), qinō "woman, wife"		gunḗ (Note: See also Thr goni "woman".) (gunaikos) (Note: See also Phry knaiko, knaikan "woman".) "woman, wife" < *gʷ_{u}n-eh₂ (> gynecology); Boet baná "woman"; Myc ku-na-ja (gunaia)	gnā (gnā́s-) "wife of a god", jánis, jánī "woman, wife"	Av gǝnā, γnā, ǰaini-, Past jinə́i, njlə́i "girl"; NPers zan "woman, wife"; Kurd jin "woman, wife"	OCS žena "woman, wife"	OPrus gena "woman, wife"	Gaul bnanom "of the women" (g. pl.); OIr ben (mná) "woman, wife" < *gʷén-eH₂ (*gʷn-eH₂-s), bé (neut.) "wife < *gʷén; W benyw "woman"	kin (knoǰ) "woman"	zonjë "lady, wife, woman" < *gʷen-yeH₂; Gheg grue, Tosk grua "wife" < *gʷn-ōn	A śäṁ (pl. śnu), B śana "woman, wife"	Hitt ku(w)an(a) "woman"; Luw wanatti "woman, wife"; Lyd kãna- "wife", "woman"
*pótis "master, ruler, husband"		-faþs "lord, leader"	potis "able, capable, possible"	pósis "husband"	páti "master, husband, ruler"	Av paiti, Parthian pet, OPers pāti "master, lord, husband, commander"	OCS gospodĭ "lord, master"	Lith pats "husband, one oneself"		hay "husband, chief of family"	pata "in possession of something"	Toch. A pats 'husband'	
*déms pótis "master of the house"				despótēs "lord, master, owner" (> despot); despoina (< *dés-pot-ni̯a) "lady" (fem. of despotes)	dámpati "lord of the house; (dual) husband and wife"; patír dán	də̃ṇg paitiś "lord"							
*gʰóstis "guest, host, stranger"	guest (< OE giest); host < Lat. hostis; hospital, hostel, hotel < Lat. hospes	gasts "guest"	hostis "stranger, guest"; hostīlis "hostile"; hospes, hospit- "host, guest, visitor" < hostipotis < PIE *gʰóstipotis (*gʰóstis + *pótis)				OCS gostĭ "guest"; gospodĭ "lord, master" < PIE *gʰóstipotis						
*weyḱ- "settlement, to enter, settle"	-wick, -wich < Lat. vīcus	weihs "village, countryside"	vīcus "village, settlement"	oîkos "house, dwelling place"; oiko·nomía "management of household administration" (> economy)	viś "settlement, dwelling space"		OCS vĭsĭ "hamlet, village"	OLith viešė "settlement"; Lith viešas "public"			vis "land, country, place"	B īke "place, location"	
*wiḱpótis "master of the household; lord, clan chief"					viśpáti "chief of a tribe or settlement, lord"			Lith viẽšpats "lord"					
*h₃rḗǵs "king, ruler"	bishopric, rich (< OE rīċe "king, dominion")	reiks, -ric (in personal names) "king"	rēx, rēg- "king" ⇒ (Note: regal, regalia, regicide, royal, etc.)		rāj-, rājan "king" (> maharaja, Raj (as in British Raj))				Gaul *rīx "king" (In personal names. E.g., Vercingetorix, etc.), Welsh rhi "king"				
*tewtéh₂ "community, people" (Note: Joseph Vendryes had suggested that compound names with the stem seem to be common around the southeast and the Balkans. However, the stem "is attested ... in Messapic, in Osco-Umbrian, in Venetic, in Gaulish, in Celtiberian, in Brittonic languages, in Welsh, in German and in the Baltic languages", as seen, for instance, in Illyrian Teuta (a Illyrian female ruler); Messapic teuta (community) and Taotor (name of deity); tribal name Teutons.) (Note: However, Robert Beekes suggests a non-Indo-European substrate origin for the stem and its reflexes.)	OE þeod "people, nation"	Goth þiuda "folk"; ModGerm Deutsch < Proto-Germ *þeudō	Osc touto "community"; Umbr totam "tribe"	(Note: Woudhuizen lists possible reflexes: Phrygian totos, teutous; Mycenaean te-u-ta-(ko-ro). Another reflex appears in Thracian personal name Tautomedes, cited by J. P. Mallory, and Ancient Macedonian (Pelasgian?) general Teutamus. In the same vein, Rick Derksen, in his Etymological Dictionary of the Baltic Inherited Lexicon, mentions as "evidence from the other branches" the personal names Greek (Hom.) Τευταμίδης and Macedonian Τεύταμος.)	Sans Tati तति (mass, crowd)		(Note: Derksen (2015) considers that "closest Slavic cognate" of tauta is Slavic *tjûdjъ (c) ‘foreign’, which he derives from *teudʰ-i̯o-, but it is otherwise a possible Germanic borrowing.)	Lith tautà "a people"; OPru tauto "country"	OIr tuath "tribe, people" (e.g., Tuatha Dé Danann "tribe of goddess Danu"); Celt Toutatis (Teutates) "name of a god"				?Hitt tuzzi- "army"; ?Luw tuta "army"
*h₁lewdʰ- "people"	OE leode, lēod "a people, a group, nation"	OHG liut "people, population"	Proto-Italic *louðeros > Latin līber "free; name of a deity", Faliscan loiferto; Pael loufir "free man"; Ven louderos "child";	eleútheros "free", Eleutherios "the liberator (epithet of Dionysus)"; Myc e-re-u-te-ro/a "a free allowance", e-re-u-te-ro-se "to make free, remit"			OCS ljudinŭ "free man"; Pol lud "people, folk"	Lith liaudis "folk"					

== Pronouns and particles ==
PIE	English	Gothic	Latin	Ancient Greek	Sanskrit	Iranian	Slavic	Baltic	Celtic	Armenian	Albanian	Tocharian	Hittite
*éǵh₂ "I"	I (< OE iċ)	ik "I"	egō "I" < *egoH₂	egṓ, egṓn "I"	ahám "I" < *egH₂-om	Av azǝm, OPers adam, Parth. az "I" < *egH₂-om; Kurd ez "I (direct case)"	OCS azŭ As "I" "Ia"	Lith àš, OLith eš, OPrus as, Latv es "I"	es "I"	es "I"	u, unë "I" (-në possibly originally a suffix)	ñuk "I"	ūk "I" influenced by ammuk "me"
*h₁me "me (acc.)"	me (< OE mē, mec < *H₁me-ge)	mik "me (acc.)"	mē(d) "me (acc.)"	emé, me "me (acc.)"	mām "me (acc.)" < *H₁mē-m, mā "me (acc. encl.)"	Av mąm "me" Kurd mi "me" Past mā "I [oblique case]"	OCS mę "me (acc.)" < *H₁mē-m	OPrus men "me" < h₁me-m	OIr me-sse, mé, W mi "I"	is "me (acc.)" <? *H₁me-ge	mua, mue "me (acc.)" < *H₁mē-m		ammuk "me (acc., dat.)" < *H₁me-ge, -mu "me (acc. encl.)"
*h₁meǵʰye "me (dat.)", *(h₁)moy "me (dat. encl.)"	me (< OE mē)	mis "me (dat.)"	mihi "me (dat.)"	moi "me (dat., gen. encl.)"	máhya(m) "me (dat.)", mḗ, me "me (dat. encl.)"	Av maibya "me (dat.)" (? not in Pokorny), me (Old Avestan moi) "me (dat. encl.)"	OCS mi (dat enc.) < *(H₁)moi	OPrus maiy "me (dat. encl.)"	OIr infix -m- "me"; W -'m infixed accusative first person singular pronoun "me"	inj "me (dat.)"	meje		ammuk "me (acc., dat.)" < *h₁me-ge, -mi "me (dat. encl.)"
*h₁meme-, *h₁mene- "of me, mine"; *h₁mo-yo-, * h₁me-yo- "my"	my, mine (< OE mīn < *H₁mei-no-)	meins "my"; meina "of me"	meī "of me"; meus "my" < *H₁me-yo-	emeĩo "of me"; emós "my"	máma "of me"; ma/má "my" < *H₁mo-	Av mana, OPers manā "of me"; Av ma (m/n), mā (f) "my", NPers az āne man-; Kurd a/ê min	OCS mene "to me", moj/a/e (m/f/n) "mine"	Lith mane "me (acc.)", OPrus mais/maia "my"	W fy^{n} "of me, my"; Breton ma "of me, my"	im "my"	im "my" (article i + em)	AB ñi "my" < Proto-Tocharian *mäñi	miš "my" < *H₁me-yo-
*túh₂ "you" (nom. sg.)	thou (< OE þū "you")	þu "you"	tū "you"	Doric tú (standard sú)	t(u)vám "you";	Av tū "you" NPers to "you" Kurd tu, ti Past tə "you"	OCS ty "you"	Lith tù, OPr tu "you"	OIr tū, tu-ssu, tu-sso, W ti	du "you"	ti "you"	A tu, B t(u)we "you"	zik, zikka "you" < *tega < *te + *egō
*wéy "we"; *n̥smé, encl. *nos "us"	we (< OE wē), us (< OE ūs < PGerm *uns < *n̥s)	weis "we", uns "us"	nōs "we, us"	hēm- "we, us"; (Note: hēm- < *ām- (with h- after hum- "you (pl.)") < *asm- < *n̥sm-.) Aeol ámme "us" < *asme < *n̥sme	vay-ám "we" < *wei-óm, asmān "us" < *n̥sme + acc. -ān, encl. nas "us" < *nos	Av vaēm "we", ahma "us", encl. nǝ̄, nā̊, nō "us"	Bulg nìe "we", OCS gen. nasŭ "ours" < *nōs-oHom	OPr gen. nōuson "ours" < *nōs-oHom	OIr ni "we, us" <? *s-nēs, gen. ar n- < *n̥s-rō-m; W ni "we" < *nēs		na "we" < *nŏs, ne "us" < *nōs	A was, B wes "we"	wēs "we" < *wei-es, anzāš "us", encl. naš "us"
*yū́ "you (nom. pl.)"; *uswé, *usmé, encl. *wos "you (acc./dat. pl.)"	ye (< OE gē "you (nom. pl.)"), you (< OE ēow (Note: OE ēow (acc., dat.) and ēow-ic̣ (acc., with the same -c̣ ending visible in 1st. sg. acc. mēc̣ "me", also modern German mich "me"), likewise Old High German iuwih "you (acc./dat. pl.)" (modern euch), appear to have the same origin as izw- in Gothic izwis "you (acc./dat. pl)", with unexplained loss of -z-. izwis appears to come from stem izw- plus originally genitive -is, where izw- comes ultimately from PIE *us-we with the loss of u- also visible in Avestan and Celtic, followed by the addition of a prothetic i-. (Ringe, 2006)) "you (acc./dat. pl.)")	jūs "you (nom. pl.)", izwis "you (acc./dat. pl.)"	vōs "you (nom./acc. pl.)"	hum- "you (pl.)"; Aeol úmme "you (acc. pl.)" < *usme	yūyám "you (nom. pl.)", yuṣmā́n "you (acc. pl.)" < y- + *usme + acc. -ān, encl. vas "you (obl. pl.)"	Av yūžǝm, yūš "you (nom. pl.)", yūšmat̃ "you (abl. pl.)", encl. vā̊ "you (obl. pl.)"; Kur Win	OCS vy "you (nom./acc. pl.)", vasŭ "yours (pl.)"	Lith jū̃s "you (nom. pl.)", jū̃sų "yours (pl.)"; OPr iouson "yours (pl.)"	OIr sī, sissi "you (nom. pl.)" < *sw-, uai-b "of you (pl.)" < *ō-swī, NIr far n- "your (pl.)"; W chwi "you (nom. pl.)" < *sw-	du, tu "you"	ju "you (nom. pl.)" < *u < *vos	A yas, B yes "you (nom. pl.)"	sumes < *usme
*só "that" (demonstrative pronoun)	the (< OE se), that (< OE þæt), there (< OE þēr, þǣr, þār)	sa, þata "the", "that"	sī "if", tum "then", iste "that" (near you), sum "him"	ho, to "the"	sáh, sā, tàt "that, the"	Avestan ha "this"	OCS tŭ "this, that"	Lith tàs "that"	OIr so "this", sí "she"; W hi "she"	ayd "that near you", da "that one near you" (ay- < PIE *éy)	tërë "whole"		
*ḱe, *ḱís, *ḱos "this" (at first a deictic particle, later became a demonstrative pronoun)	he, she, it (< OE hē, hēo, hit), here (< OE hēr)	his "this"	cis "on this side, before"	ekeînos "that" (< PIE *h₁e-ḱey-h₁enos)			OCS sĭ "this", se "behold"	Lith šis "this", še "behold"	Primitive Irish koi "here"	ays "this", sa "this one" (ay- < PIE *éy)			kāš "this" Palaic kii̯at "here"
*h₁énos "that, yon" (demonstrative pronoun in late PIE)	yon (< OE ġeon < PIE *Hyo-h₁enos)	jains "that, yon" (< PIE *Hyo-h₁enos)	enim "truly"	ekeînos "that" (< PIE *h₁e-ḱey-h₁enos)			OCS onŭ "that, yon" (if not from PIE *h₂en-os)	Lith anas "he, that" (if not from PIE *h₂en-os)		ayn "that, yon", na "that one, yon one" (ay- < PIE *éy)		A äntsaṃ, B intsu "which, what kind of"	anniš "that"
*ís, *éy, *h₁é (anaphoric pronoun)	OE ī- "the same"	is "he"	is (anaphoric pronoun)	ía "one" (f.)	ayám, iyám, idám "this"	Av aiiə̄m "this"	OCS i "he" (merged with PIE *Hyós)	Lith jis "he" (if not from PIE *Hyós)	OIr é "he", ed "it"; W ef, e, fe, o, fo "he"		ai "he", ajo "she"		
*s(w)e- "oneself"; (reflexive pronoun)	self (< OE self, seolf)	swes (ref. gn. pn.), OHG sih (ref. pn.)	sē (ref. pn.)	hé (ref. pn.)	sva- (ref. pn.)	Avestan hva- (ref. pn.) Kurd xwe "itself, myself, etc."NPers xod "self, itself"	Bulg sèbe "oneself", OCS svoji (ref. gn. pn.)	Lith savè "oneself", OPrus swajs "my own, myself"	OIr fein (self, himself); W hun(an) "self, myself, himself/herself etc"	iwr self, himself/herself	vetë	A ṣn-i, B ṣañ "(one's) own"	Lydian s'fa- (ref. pn.), Carian sfes (ref. pn.)
*kʷíd, kʷód "what"	what (< OE hwæt)	ƕa "what"	quid "what?", quod "what..., that..."	tí "what?", tì "what..."	kím "what"	NPers či, če "what"	Bulg kakvò "what", OCS čь-to "what?"		OIr cid "what?"	*i (ēr) (< *hi), inčʿ (< *hi-nč) "what?"	çfarë "what?"		kuit (?) "what", kuit-ki "whatever"; Luvian kuit "what?"
*kʷís, kʷós, kʷéy/kʷóy "who?" (interrogative pronoun)	who (< OE hwā < *kʷoi)	ƕas "who?"	quis "who?", quī "who..."	tís, Thess kís, CyprArc sís "who?", tìs "who..."	kah, kā "who?"	Av kō (ka-hyā, ča-hyā) "who?, which?", čiš "who"NPers ke, ki "who?" kas "who, another person"	Bulg kòj "who", OCS kъ-to (česo) "who?"	Lith kàs "who, what"; OPrus kas "who"	OIr cia, W pwy "who"	о (oyr) "who?" "who?"	"A" kë "B" kush acc. "who?"	A kus, B k_{u}se "who, which"	kuiš "who, which"
*Hyós "who..." (relative pronoun)	yon (< OE ġeon < PIE *Hyo-h₁enos)	jains "that, yon" (< PIE *Hyo-h₁enos)	iam "already"	hós "who..., this"	yáḥ, yā́, yát "who..."	NPers -i, -e (ezafe)	OCS i "he" (merged with PIE *ís), iže "who..." (-že < PIE *gʰe)	Lith jis "he" (if not from PIE *ís)	OIr -a (relative pronoun forming suffix)				
*-kʷe "and; any"	though (< OE þeah < *to-we-kʷe)	-(u)h "and", ƕaz-uh "whoever"	-que "and", quis-que "each one, whoever"; Venetic -ke "and"; South Picenian -p "and"	-te "and", tís te, hós-te "whoever"	-ca, káś-ca, kás-cit"whoever"	Av ča, OPers čā "and"; Av čiš-ca, OPers čiš-čiy "whoever"	Bulg če "but, and, because"; Old Czech a-če, ač "if"		OIr na-ch, MW nac "not" < "*and not"; (Note: Cf. Latin ne-que, Gothic ni-h, Hittite ni-kku, Lydian ni-k "and not, nor".) Lepontic -pe "and"	o-kʿ "whoever"	dhe "and"		Lydian -k "and"; Hitt kuis-ki, Lycian ti-ke "whoever"
*-we, *-wē "or"		(possibly) -u (question marker)	-ve "or"	ḗ, ēé "or"	vā "or"	Av va "or"			OIr nó, W neu "or" < PIE *né-we			A pat, B wat "or"	
*n̥- "not, un-"	un- (< OE un-)	un- "un-"	in- (archaic en-) "un-"	a-, an- "un-"	a-, an- "un-"	Av, OPers a-, an- "un-",			OIr in-, ē-, an-, W an- "un-"	an- "un-"		AB a(n)-, am-, e(n)-, em-, on- "un-"	
*né "not"	ne "not" (< OE ne)	ni "not"	nē "not, don't, lest"		ná "not"	NPers nā- "un-"; Kurd ni/ne/nek	OCS ne, ne- "not"	Lith ne- "not", ne "no"; OPrus ni- "not"	OIr ná "not"		nuk "not" < PIE *ne h₁óy-kos		
*méh₁ "don't"				mē "don't", "shouldn't", etc.	mā́ "don't"	NPers ma- "don't" (archaic)				mi "don't"	mo "don't"	AB mā "not, un-"	
*(ne) h₂óyu kʷid "definitely not, never, not on your life"				oukí, ou "not"						očʻ "no, not"	as "neither, nor"		

== Numbers ==
PIE	English	Gothic	Latin	Ancient Greek	Sanskrit	Iranian	Slavic	Baltic	Celtic	Armenian	Albanian	Tocharian	Hittite
*sem- "one, together"	same (< ON samr); OE sam- "together"; [also German zusammen]	sama "same"	sem-el "once", sem-per "always", sim-plex "single, simple", sin-gulī "one each, single"	heĩs, hén, mía "one" < *sems, *sem, *smiH₂	sam- "together", samá "same, equal, any"	Av hama-, OPers hama- "any, all" Past sam "even, fine"	OCS samŭ "self, alone, one"	Lith san-, są- "with"; OPrus sa-, sen- "with, dividing"	OIr samlith "at the same time"; W hafal "equal"	mi "one"	gjithë "all" < PAlb *semdza	A sas, B ṣe "one" < *sems	
*(h₁)óynos, (h₁)óywos "one"	one (< OE ān)	ains "one"	ūnus (archaic oinos)	oĩnos "one (on a die)", oĩ(w)os "alone"	(ēka- < *oi-ko-; Mitanni-Aryan aika-vartana "one turn (around a track)")	Av aēva-, OPers aiva-, (NPers yek-/yak- "one, only, alone")	OCS inŭ "one, another"	Lith víenas, OPrus ains "one"	OIr ōen, W un "one"	andr-ēn "right there", ast-ēn "right here"	? Gheg tânë, Tosk tërë "all" < PIE *tod-oino-; ??? një "one" < *ňân < PIE *eni-oino- (Note: All suggested etymologies of një "one" are highly speculative, at best. This etymology is one of two given by E. Hamp in Indo-European Numerals (Jadranka Gvozdanović, ed., 1992), pp. 903-904; the other is simply from PIE *eni- (or *H₂en-), a PIE deictic particle visible in Sanskrit anyá- "the other", OCS onŭ "that one", Lithuanian anàs "that one". Michiel de Vaan, in a review of Demiraj's Sistemi i numerimit, suggests PIE *H₂en-io-no- > pre-Proto-Albanian *ëńán > Proto-Albanian *ńâ > një. M. Huld (Basic Albanian Etymologies, p. 101) attempts to derive një from PIE *sm-iH₂, feminine of *sem "one" and reflected in Ancient Greek mía; this etymology is also tentatively suggested in Don Ringe et al. "IE and Computational Cladistics", p. 75 (Transactions of the Philological Society 100, 2002).)	B -aiwenta "group" < "*unit"	ās "one"
*dwóh₁, neut. *dwóy(H₁) "two"	two (< OE twā)	twái (fem. twōs, neut. twa) "two"	duo "two"	dúō "two"	dvā́(u) "two"	Av dva, fem. neut. baē "two"; NPers do "two"; Kurd diwa "two (fem.)"	OCS dŭva "two"	Lith dù, OPrus dwai "two"	OIr da, W dau (fem. dwy) "two"	erku "two"	dy "two"	A wu, B wi "two"(<PTC *tuwó)	dā-, ta-; HLuw tuwa/i- "two"; Lyc kbi- "two"; Mil tba "two" (Note: For example, qñnã-tba "twelve" (litt. "ten" plus "two").)
*tréyes (fem. *tisres, neut. *tríH₂) "three"	three (< OE þrīe)	þreis "three"	trēs "three"	treĩs "three"	tráyas (fem. tisrás) "three"	Av θrayō, θrayas (fem. tisrō, neut. θri), OPers çi-, Parth hrē "three"	OCS trĭje "three"	Lith trỹs, OPrus tris, Latg treis "three"	OIr trí (fem. téoir), W tri (fem. tair, teir) "three"	erekʿ "three"	tre masc., tri fem. "three"	A tre, B trai "three"	tri- "three"; teriyas- (gen. pl.)
*kʷetwóres (fem. *kʷétesres, neut. *kʷetwṓr) "four"	four (< OE fēower)	fidwor "four" (In Germanic influenced by pénkʷe "five")	quattuor "four" (Note: See also: Umb peturpursus "quadruped".)	téssares "four"	masc. catvā́ras (acc. catúras), neut. catvā́ri, fem. cátasras "four"	Av masc. čaθwārō (acc. čaturąm), fem. čataŋrō "four"; NPers čahār "four"; Kurd çwar	OCS četyre "four"	Lith keturì, OPrus ketturei "four" (Note: Cf. Thr ketri- "four".)	Gaul petuar[ios] "four" OIr ceth(a)ir (fem. cethēoir, influenced by fem. tēoir "three") "four"; W pedwar (fem. pedair) "four"	čʿorkʿ, kʿaṙ (rare) "four	katër "four"	A śtwar, B śtwer "four"	(remodelled in Hittite and Luwian); Lyc teteri
*pénkʷe "five"	five (< OE fīf)	fimf "five"	quīnque "five" (Note: See also: Osc pomp- "five".)	pénte "five"	páñca "five"; Mitanni-Aryan panza- "five"	Av panča "five"; Kurd pênc/pênz	OCS pętĭ "five"	Lith penkì, OPrus penkei "five" (Note: See also Phry pinke "five".)	Gaul pinpe-, pompe "five" OIr cóic, W pum(p) "five"	hing "five"	pesë "five"	A päñ, B piś "five"	Luw paⁿta "five"
*swéḱs "six"	six (< OE siex)	sáihs "six"	sex "six"	héx, dial. wéx "six"	ṣáṣ "six"	Av xšvaš "six"	OCS šestĭ "six"	Lith šešì, OPrus uššai "six"	Celtib sues "six"; Gaul suexos "sixth"; OIr sé, W chwe(ch) "six"	vecʿ "six"	gjashtë "six"	A ṣäk, B ṣkas "six"	
*septḿ̥ "seven"	seven (< OE seofon)	sibun "seven"	septem "seven"	heptá "seven"	saptá "seven"; Mitanni-Aryan šatta- "seven"	Av hapta, NPers haft-, "seven"	OCS sedmĭ "seven"	Lith septynì, OPrus septinnei "seven"	OIr secht, W saith "seven"	eawtʿn "seven"	shtatë "seven"	A ṣpät, B ṣukt "seven"	sipta- "seven"
*h₁oḱtṓ(w) "eight"	eight (< OE eahta)	ahtáu "eight"	octō "eight"	oktṓ "eight"	aṣṭā́(u) "eight"	Av ašta "eight"	OCS osmĭ "eight" (Note: Built upon osmŭ "eighth" < *H₁ok̂t-mo-.)	Lith aštuonì, OPrus astonei, Latg ostoni "eight"	Gaul oxtu- "eight" OIr ocht n- "eight"; (Note: With nasalization after *septḿ̥ "seven".) W wyth "eight"	utʿ "eight"	tetë "eight" < *H₁ok̂tō-t-	A okät, B okt "eight"	Lyc aitãta "eight"
*(h₁)néwn̥ "nine"	nine (< OE nigon)	niun "nine"	novem "nine"	ennéa "nine"	náva "nine"	Av nava, NPers noh- "nine"	OCS devętĭ "nine" < *newn̥-ti- (Influenced by *dékm̥t "ten")	Lith devynì (influenced by *dékm̥t "ten"), OPrus newinei "nine"	OIr noí n-, W naw "nine"	inn "nine"	nëntë "nine" < *newn̥-ti-	AB ñu	Lyc nuñtãta "nine"
*déḱm̥t "ten"	ten (< OE tien)	taíhun "ten"	decem "ten"	déka "ten"	dáśa "ten"	Av dasa, NPers dah- "ten"	OCS desętĭ "ten"	Lith dẽšimt, OPrus desimtan "ten"	Gaul decam- "ten"; Celtib tekam- "ten"; OIr deich, W deg, deng "ten"	tasn "ten"	dhjetë "ten" < *dék̂m̥t-i-	A śäk, B śak "ten"	(Note: There is the possibility that Lycian sñta could mean either "ten" or "(one) hundred".)
*wídḱm̥ti(h₁) "twenty" < *dwi-dḱm̥t-i(h₁) "two tens"	(remodelled)	(remodelled)	vīgintī "twenty"	eíkosi "twenty"	viṁśatí "twenty", dviṁśatí "twenty"	Av vīsaiti, Ossetian insäi "twenty"	(remodelled)	(remodelled)	OIr fiche (fichet), OW uceint "twenty"	kʿsan "twenty"	zet "twenty"	A wiki, B ikäṃ "twenty"	
*ḱm̥tóm "hundred" < *dḱm̥tóm	hundred (< OE hund, hund-red)	hunda (pl.) "hundred"	centum "hundred"	he-katón "hundred"	śatám "hundred"	Av satǝm "hundred"	OCS sŭto "hundred"	Lith šim̃tas, OPrus simtan "hundred"	OIr cét, W can(t) "hundred"		qind "hundred" (possibly borrowed from Latin centum)	A känt, B kante "hundred"	
*ǵʰéslom "thousand"			mīlle "thousand" < PIE *sm-ih₂-ǵʰésl-ih₂	kʰī́lioi "thousand" < PIE *ǵʰesl-i-yoy	sahásra "thousand" < PIE *sm̥-ǵʰéslom	Av hazaŋra "thousand" < PIE *sm̥-ǵʰéslom							
*tuHsont- "thousand"	thousand (< OE þūsend)	þūsundi "thousand"					OCS tysǫšti "thousand"	Lith tūkstantis; OPrus tusimtons "thousand"					

== Body ==
PIE	English	Gothic	Latin	Ancient Greek	Sanskrit	Iranian	Slavic	Baltic	Celtic	Armenian	Albanian	Tocharian	Hittite
*krep- "body"	(mid)riff (< OE hrif)		corpus, corporis "body" ⇒ (Note: corps, corpse, corporal, corporation, incorporate, etc.)		kṛ́p "beautiful appearance, beauty"	Av kéhrp "corpse, body"	HBS krěpati "to die, become a corpse"				kurm "torso" and krep		
*káput ~ *kapwéts "head"	head (< OE hēafod); OE hafela, hafola "head"	haubiþ "head"	caput, capitis "head" ⇒ (Note: cap, cape, chapeau, capital, chapter, capitulate, decapitate, per capita, kaput, etc.)	(Note: But not kephalḗ!)	kapā́la "skull, cranium; bowl"						kapelë "hat"; Latin caput		
*dáḱru, *h₂éḱru "tear"	tear (< OE tēar, tæhher)	tagr "tear"	lacrima (archaic lacruma / dacrima) "tear" (> lachrymose)	dákru "tear"	áśru "tear"	Av asrū- "tear"; Kurd hêsir "tear"		OPrus assara "tear", Lith ašara "tear	OIr dēr, W deigr "tear"; Cornish dagr "tear"	artawsr "tear" < *drak̂ur		A ākär "tear", B pl. akrūna "tears"	isḫaḫru "tear"
*dn̥ǵʰuh₂-, *dn̥ǵʰwéh₂ "tongue"	tongue (< OE tunge)	tuggō "tongue"	lingua "tongue" (archaic dingua) ⇒ (Note: language, lingo etc.)		jihvā́ "tongue" < *ĝiĝʰwā, juhū́	Av hizvā < *ĝiĝʰwā, OPers hizān, Parth ezβān "tongue", NPers zabān; Kurd izman "tongue"	OCS języ-kŭ "tongue" < *n̥ĝʰū-k-	OPrus inzuws "tongue", Lith liežuvis "tongue"	teng "tongue"; W tafod "tongue, language"	lezu "tongue" (influenced by lizem, "I lick")	gjuhë "tongue"	A käntu, B kantwo "tongue" (*kantwa < *tankwa)	
*h₁ésh₂r̥, *h₁esh₂nés "blood"			archaic aser, sanguis "blood" (< possibly h₁sh₂-én- obl. stem + guen) (> sanguine, etc.)	éar "blood"	ásṛj, asnás "blood"	OP ahr̥ "blood"		Lat asins, Ltg asnis (gen. ašņa) "blood"	īsarnom "blood-colored, iron"	ariwn "blood"		A ysār "blood"	ēsḫar (esḫanas) "blood"
*ǵ(o)nH₂dʰos "jaw, cheek, chin"	chin (< OE c̣inn)	kinnus "cheek"	gena "cheek"	génus (génuos) "chin, jaw"; gnátʰos, gnatʰmós "jaw" < *ĝnH₂dʰ-	hánu-ṣ "jaw" < *ǵʰenu-s, gaṇḍa "cheek"	Av zānu- "jaw-" < *ǵʰenu-s, OPers danūg < *danu-ka-, Parth zanax "chin, jaw"; NPers gune "cheek", chune "jaw"; Kurd gup "cheek" Past žā́ma "jaw"		OPrus żauna "jaw", Lith žándas "cheek", žiáuna "gill"	OIr gi(u)n "mouth"; W gên, pl. geneu "cheek, chin"; Old Cornish pl. genau < *genewes "cheeks, chins"	cn-awt "jaw, cheek"		A śanwe-m "jaw"	
*ǵónu, ǵnéws "knee"	knee (< OE cnēo)	kniu "knee"	genū "knee" (> genuflect)	gónu (Hom gen. gounós < *gonwós) "knee", pró-kʰnu "with outstretched knee" < *pró-gʰnu	jā́nu- "knee", pra-jñus "bow-legged"	Av zānu- acc. žnūm, dat./abl. pl. žnubyō "knee", fra-šnu- "holding the knee forward"; Parth zānūk, NPers zānū "knee"	Rus zvenó "knee"		OI glún "knee"	cunr, nom pl. cungkʿ "knee"	gjuni "knee" < Post-PIE *ĝnu-n(o)-	A kanweṃ, B keni "two knees"	genu "knee"
*ǵómbʰos "tooth, row of teeth"	comb (< OE camb)	OHG kamb "comb"		gómphos "bolt, nail"; gómphíos "molar tooth"	jámbha- "tooth, tusk; set of teeth (pl.)"; jámbhya- "molar teeth"	Pash žâma "jawbone"; Khot ysīmä "tooth"	OCS zǫbŭ, Ukr zub, Pol ząb "tooth"	Latv zùobs "tooth"; Lith žam̃bas "sharp edge"			dhëmb "tooth, tusk"	A kam, B keme "tooth"	
*h₃dónts, *h₃dn̥t- "tooth"	tooth (< OE tōþ < *H₁dont-)	tunþus "tooth" < *H₁dn̥t-	dēns (dentis) "tooth" < *H₁dn̥t- (> dental)	odṓn (odóntos) "tooth" < Proto-Greek *edónt-, cf. Aeol. édontes "teeth" (> orthodontist, etc.)	dán, dántas "tooth"	Av dantan-, dātā "tooth"; NPers dandân "tooth"; Kurd diran, didan, dan "tooth"	Russ desná "gum" < *H₁dent-sn-	OPrus dants "tooth", Lith dantis "tooth"	OIr dēt "tooth", W dant "tooth"	atamn "tooth"			
*h₃ésth₁, *h₂óst- "bone"			os (ossis) "bone"	ostéon "bone" (osteoporosis, etc.)	ásthi (asthnás) "bone"	Av ast-, asti- (gen. pl. astąm, instr. pl. azdbīš) "bone" NPers ostoxan "bone"; Kurd hestî, hestû "bone"	OCS kostĭ "bone"		OIr asil "limb", MIr asna "rib" <? *astonyo-; MW ass-en, asseu "rib", W asgwrn "bone" < *ost-ko-	os-kr "bone"	asht, ahstë "bone"	B āy, pl. āsta "bone"	ḫastāi- "bone"
*H₂ous- "ear"	ear (< OE ēare)	áusō "ear"	auris "ear"	oũs "ear"	ūṣa "cavity of the ear"	Av uši "both ears"; NPers guš "ear"	OCS uxo (ušese) "ear"	OPrus auss "ear", Lith ausis "ear"	OIr āu, ō "ear"	unkn, nom pl. akanǰkʿ "ear"	vesh "ear" < *ōus, *ōs-		
*h₃ókʷs "eye"	eye (< OE ēage)	áugō "eye"	oculus "eye" < *ōkʷelo-s ⇒ (Note: ocular, binoculars, etc.)	ósse "both eyes"; ómma "eye" < *óp-mn̥; ókkon "eye"	ákṣi (akṣṇás) "eye"	Av aši "both eyes"	OCS oko "eye"	OPrus aks "eye", Lith akis "eye"	OIr enech "face", W wyneb "face", Cornish enep "face"	akn, nom pl. ačʿkʿ "eye"	sy "eye"	A ak, B ek "eye"	
*h₁óh₃(e)s "mouth"	Scot ure (< OE ōr, ōra)	Nor óss "river mouth"	ōs, ōris "mouth" (> oral)		Ved ā́s "mouth, face"	Av āh "mouth"	OCS usta "mouth"	Lith úostas "mouth of a river, harbor"	OIr á "mouth"				aiš, gen. iššāš "mouth"
*ḱerd- "heart"; *ḱred-dʰē- "to believe" (See also ḱréd·dʰh₁eti)	heart (< OE heorte)	haírtō "heart"	cor (cordis) "heart"; crēdō "I believe" < *krezdō- < *ḱred-dʰē- ⇒ (Note: core, cordial, record, accord, discord, concord, accordion, misericordia, courage, etc.)	kardíā, Homeric kradíē, Cypriot korízdā "heart" < *ḱr̥d(y)ā; poetic kẽr (kẽros) "heart" < *ḱḗr (> cardiac, cardiology. etc.)	hṛd "heart" < post-PIE *ǵʰr̥d; hṛdaya, hārdi "heart";	Av zǝrǝd "heart", Pashto zṛə "heart" < post-PIE *ǵʰr̥d;	OCS sŭrdĭce "heart", serda "medium, core"	OPrus siran "heart" (acc.), seyr "heart", serds "core", Lith širdis "heart", šerdis "core"	OIr cride "heart"; W craidd "center"; Gaul crid "heart"	sirt "heart"		A kri "will", B pl. käryāñ "hearts"	Hitt karz (kardias) "heart"; Luw zarza "heart"
*h₃nebʰ- "navel, hub"; *h₃nóbʰōl "navel"	navel (< OE nafola); nave (< OE nafu)	OHG nabalo "navel"; ON nafli "navel"	umbilīcus "navel"; umbō "elbow"	omphalós "navel; umbilical cord"	nā́bhi "navel, belly button; center"; nábhya "nave, center part of a wheel"	NPers nāf "navel", nāv- "deep" Past nom, naw "navel"			OIr imbliu "navel"				
*kréwh₂- "gore, blood (blood outside the body)"	raw "uncooked food" (< OE hræw "corpse, carrion")	ON hrár "raw"	cruor "thick blood, gore"; crūdus "raw, bloody", crūdēlis "cruel, rude" ⇒ (Note: cruel, crude)	kréas "flesh, meat"; kréa "raw flesh"	krávis- "raw flesh"; kravyá "raw flesh, carrion", krūrá "bloody, raw"	Av xrūra, xrūma "bloody"; vi-xrūmant- "bloodless"; xrvi.dru "of the bloody mace [of Aeshma]" YAv xrvišyant "grim, bloodthirsty"	OCS kry "blood"; Rus krov' "blood"	OPrus crauyo, krawian; Lith kraũjas "blood", krùvinas "bloody"; Latv kreve "coagulated blood, bloody scab"	OIr crúaid, MIr crū "blood", W crau "blood, gore"				
*néh₂s "nose"	nose (< OE nosu)	ON nǫs "nose"	nāsus, nāris "nose" (> nasal)		nas- "nose"	Av nāh-, nā̊ŋhan-, OPers acc. sg. nāham "nose"	OCS nosŭ "nose"	OPrus nasi "nose", Lith nosis "nose"					
*pṓds, *ped- "foot" (See also *ped-)	foot (< OE fōt)	fōtus "foot"	pēs (pedis) "foot" (> pedal, etc.)	poús (podós) "foot" ⇒ (Note: tripod, podium, etc.)	pā́d- (padás) "foot"	Av pad-, OPers pād, Parth pāδ "foot" NPers pa "foot"; Kurd pê Past px̌a "foot	OCS pěšǐ "on foot", pęta "heel"	OPrus pida "foot", Lith pėda "foot"	OIr īs "below" < PIE loc. pl. *pēd-su; W is(od) "below, under; lower (than)"	otn "foot", otkʿ "feet"	poshtë "below"	A pe "foot", B paiyye "foot"	pata-, CLuw pāta-, Lyc pedi- "foot"
*tpḗrsneh₂ "heel, upper thigh"	OE fiersn "heel, calx"	fairzna "heel"	perna "gammon"; Spa pierna "leg"	ptérnē "heel, hoof; footstep"	pā́rṣṇi "heel; rear of the army; kick"								paršna- "loins"
*h₂(e)rmós "arm, forequarter"	arm (< OE earm)	arms "arm"	armus "shoulder, forequarter"	harmós "joint (anatomy); link; bolt"	īrmá- "arm, forequarter (of an animal)"		OCS ramo "shoulder"						
*h₃nṓgʰs "nail (finger or toe)"	nail (< OE næġel)	nagls "nail"	unguis "fingernail, toenail; claw; hoof"; ungula "hoof, claw; an aromatic spice"	ónux "claw, nail, hoof; a kind of aromatic substance; onyx (the gem)"	nakhá "nail"; áṅghri "foot; foot of a seat; tree root"	Npers nāxon "nail"	OCS noga "foot, leg"; nogŭtĭ "nail"	Lith nãgas "fingernail, talon"	Irsh ionga "nail", W ewin "nail"	ełung "nail"	nyell "nail"	A maku, B mekwa "nail"	ša-an-ku-wa- "nail"
*yḗkʷr̥, yekʷnés "liver"			jecur (jecinoris) "liver"	hẽpar (hḗpatos) "liver"	yákr̥t (yaknás) "liver"	Av yākarǝ, NPers ǰigar, Pashto iná "liver"	Church Slavonic ikra "roe", Serbian and Macedonian ikra "fish roe"	OPrus jakna, Lat aknas "liver", Lith jeknos	W (i)afu "liver"; MIr i(u)chair (i(u)chrach) "fish roe"	leard "liver"		A ykär, B yakär* "liver"	Luwian ikkwar/n- "liver" (Note: Possible Anatolian reflex of the root, as posited by Sasseville (2020).)
*ǵʰésr̥ ~ *ǵʰsrés "hand"			hir "hand" (rare, anatomical)	kheír "hand" (> chiropractor, surgery (chirurgy), enchiridion, etc.)	hás-ta "hand"	Av zas-ta "hand", NPers dast "hand"				jeṙ "hand, arm"	dorë "hand"	A tsar, B ṣar "hand"	keššar "hand", Luwian īssaris "hand"
*méh₂r̥ ~ *mh₂én- ~ *mh₂ntéh₂ "hand, the pointing one"	mound (< OE mund "hand, hand of protection, protector)	Ger vormund "legal guardian"	manus, manūs "hand" ⇒ (Note: manual, manufacture, manuscript, manipulate, manifest, maintain, manage, manumission, emancipate, mandate, demand, commend, countermand, mandatory, masturbate etc.)	márē "hand" (dubious)									manii̯aḫḫ-i, "to distribute, entrust"
*bʰeh₂ǵʰús "arm, trunk"	bough (< OE bōg)	Ger Bug "shoulder joint", ON bógr "shoulder"	fagus "beech tree"	pêkhus "forearm"	bāhú "arm"	NPers bāzū "arm"							
*h₃bʰrúHs "eyebrow"	brow, Scot broo (< OE brū)	ON brún "sharp edge; eyebrow" (Note: Dan bryn > brine; brim)		ophrū́s "eyebrow"	bhrū́ "eyebrow"	NPers abrū "eyebrow"	OCS bry "eyebrow"						
*péth₂r̥ "wing, feather" (See also *peth₂-)	feather (< OE feþer)	OHG fedara "feather" ON fjǫðr "feather"	penna < *petna "wing; feather; quill pen" (> pen)	pterón "feather, wing; winged creature"	pát·tra- "wing, pinion, feather; leaf, petal (as the plumage of a tree)"	Av Karšiptar (Karšift) "black-winged" NPers par "feather"	OCS perije "feather"		W adar "birds", W adain "wing"	trnum "to fly"			

== Animals ==
PIE	English	Gothic	Latin	Ancient Greek	Sanskrit	Iranian	Slavic	Baltic	Celtic	Armenian	Albanian	Tocharian	Hittite
*éḱwos, *h₁éḱwos "horse, fast animal"	OE eoh "horse"	aíƕa- "horse" (Note: Only in *aíƕatundi "bramble", literally "horse-tooth".)	equus "horse" (< equos)	híppos "horse"; Myc i-qo "horse" ( < *ïkkʷos)	áśva- "horse"; Mitanni-Aryan aššu- "horse"	Av aspa-, OPers asa- "horse"; Ossetian yäfs "horse" < *yéḱwos; NPers asp "horse"; Kurd hesp "horse"	OCS jastrębъ "hawk" (literally "a fast bird")	OPrus aswīnan "mare's milk", Lith ašva "mare	OIr ech; W ebol "foal, colt" (< MW ebawl < PBryth *ebọl, < PC *ep-ālos).	ēš "donkey"		A yuk, B yakwe "horse"	Luwian ásùwa "horse"; Lycian esbe "horse"
*gʷṓws "cattle" (Note: Complex ablauting stem: / Singular / / / / Plural; Language / Nom / Acc / Gen / Dat / Nom / Acc / Gen; PIE / gʷṓws / gʷṓm / gʷéws / gʷéwey / gʷówes / gʷówm̥s / gʷéwoHom; Sanskrit / gáus / gā́m / gṓs / gávē / gā́vas / gā́s / gávām; Avestan / gāuš / gąm / gāuš / gave / gā̆vō / gā̊ / gavąm)	cow (< OE cū)	Old Saxon kō, OHG chuo "cow"	bōs (bovis) "cattle"; (Note: Expected form is *vōs, not *bōs; evidently this is a borrowing from Oscan or Umbrian.) Umbrian acc. bum "cow"	boũs, Dor bõs (bo(w)ós) "cattle, cow"	gáus (gṓs) "cow"	Av gāuš (gāuš) "cow"; NPers gāv "cow"; Kurd ga "cow" Past ğwā "cow"	Croatian gòvedo "cattle" < PSlav *govędo; OCS gu-mǐno "threshing floor"	Latvian gùovs "cow"	OIr bó (bóu/báu) (Note: bóu, báu are archaic genitives; later báo, bó.) "cow"; Boand (Note: Celtic river-goddess) < Proto-Celtic *bowo-windā "white cow (or) cow-finder" (Note: In the latter case, a direct parallel to Skt. go·vinda- "cow-finder"); Boyne (Note: River in Ireland); OW buch "cow" < *boukkā, bu-gail "cowherd" < *gʷou-kʷolyos	kov "cow"	ka "ox"	A ko "cow", B ke_{u} "cow"	HierLuv wawa-, Lycian wawa-, uwa- "cow"; ?Pal kuwa(w)- "bull" (Note: Proposed by Yakubovich and Sasseville (2018).)
*péḱu "livestock"	fee; fief; feud (< OE feoh "livestock, property, money");	faihu "property, possessions, wealth, riches, money"	pecū "cattle, domestic animals"; pecūnia "money" ⇒ (Note: pecunious, impecunious)		páśu, paśú "livestock"	Av pasu "livestock", Past psə "sheep, cattle"	OCS pasti "to herd, pasture"	OLith pekus "cattle"		asr "wool"			
*h₂éwis "bird" (See also *h₂ōwyó·m)			avis "bird" (> aviary, aviation, etc.); auceps "bird-catcher; fowler; eavesdropper"; LL avicellus, aucellus "little bird" > Fre oiseau; avispex, later, auspex "augur (from watching the flight of birds)" ⇒ (Note: auspices, auspicious)	āetós "eagle; omen"; oiōnós "large bird, bird of prey; omen; bird used in augury"; oiōnoskópos "augur (from the flight of birds)"; oiōnistḗrion "place for watching bird flight; omen"	ví "bird"	Av vīš "bird"			W hwyad "ducks"	hav "chicken"			
*h₂ówis "sheep"	ewe (< OE ēow "sheep", ēowu "ewe")	awistr "sheepfold"; OHG ouwi, ou "sheep"	ovis "sheep"	ó(w)is "sheep"	ávi- "sheep"	Wakhi yobc "ewe" < PIran *āvi-či-	Bulg ovèn "ram", OCS ovĭ-ca "ewe"	OPrus awwins "ram", Lith avis "female sheep" avinas "ram"	OIr ōi "sheep"; W ewig "deer"	hov-iw "shepherd"		B eye "sheep", ā(_{u})w "ewe"	Luvian hāwa/i-, Lycian χawa- "sheep"
*h₂ŕ̥tḱos "bear"			ursus "bear"	árktos "bear"	ŕ̥kṣa- "bear"	YAv arša, Ossetian ars "bear"; NPers xers "bear"; Kurd hirç "bear"		Lith irštva "bear den" < h₂r̥tḱ-wéh₂	MIr art, W arth "bear"	arǰ "bear"	arí "bear"		ḫartaqqas (name of a beast of prey)
*ḱwṓ "hound, dog"	hound (< OE hund "dog")	hunds "dog"	canis "dog"	kúōn (kunós) "dog"; Myc ku-na-ke-ta-i, Att/Ion kunegétes "huntsman" (litt. "those who guide dogs")	śvan(śunas) "dog"	Av spā (acc. spānǝm, pl. gen. sū̆nam); MPers sak; Kurd kuçik, se, sey; Wakhi šač "dog" Past spay "dog"	Bulg kùt͡ʃe "dog", OCS suka "bitch (female dog)"	OPrus sunnis "dog", Lith šuo "dog", Latv suns "dog", Ltg suņs "dog"	OIr cú (con), W ci "dog" Cú Chulainn litt. "hound of Chulainn"; Cunobeline < Com. Britt. *Cunobelinos "strong (?) as a dog"	šun "dog"	possibly qen (disputed, possible Latin loan)	AB ku "dog" (acc. A koṃ, B kweṃ)	Hittite kuwaš (nom.), kunaš (gen.); HierLuv suwanni "dog"; Pal kuwan- "dog"; Lyd kan- "dog"
*múh₂s "mouse"	mouse, Scot moose (< OE mūs)	ON mús "mouse"	mūs "mouse"	mũs "mouse"	mū́ṣ- "mouse"	OPers muš "mouse" (? not in Pokorny; Pokorny has NPers mūš "mouse"); Kurd mişk "mouse"	OCS myšĭ "mouse"			mukn "mouse"	mi "mouse"		
*uksḗn "ox, bull"	ox (< OE oxa)	auhsa "ox"			ukṣán "bull, ox"	Av uxšan "bull"			MW ych; MidIr oss "stag, cow"; MBret ouhen			B okso "draft-ox"	
*(s)táwros "bull"	steer (< OE stēor)	ON þjórr	taurus, Osc taurom (acc.)	taûros		stawra- "bull"	OSl turŭ	Lith taũras; OPr tauris "bison"	Gaul tarvos (taruos) "bull"; OIr tarb, W tarw "bull"	tuar "cattle"	tarok		
*suHs- "pig"	sow (< OE sū); swine (< OE swīn)	ON sýr "sow"	sūs "pig"	hũs, sũs "pig"	sū-kara- "pig"; Hindi sūvar "pig"	Av hū (gen. sg.) "pig", NPers xuk "pig"	Bulg svinjà "swine, sow"	Latvian suvẽns, sivẽns "piglet"	OIr socc sáil "sea pig"; W hwch "sow, swine"	khoz "pig"	thi "pig"	B suwo "pig"	še-hu-u "pig"
*wl̥kʷos "wolf"	wolf (< OE wulf)	wulfs (wulfis) "wolf"	lupus "wolf"	lúkos "wolf"	vŕ̥ka- "wolf"	Av vǝhrka- "wolf"; NPers gorg "wolf"; Kurd gur "wolf"	Bulg vɤ̞lk "wolf", OCS vlĭkŭ "wolf"	OPrus wilks "wolf", Lith vilkas "wolf"	OIr olc (uilc) "evil"	aghves "fox"	ujk < OAlb ulk "wolf"	B walkwe "wolf"	ulippana "wolf"
*wl(o)p- "fox"			vulpes "fox"	alṓpēx "fox"	lopāśá "fox, jackal"	Av urupis "dog", raopi- "fox, jackal"; Kurd rovî, rûvî "fox"	OCS lisa "fox"	Lith lãpė "fox"; Latv lapsa "fox"	Bre louarn "fox" (< PCel *loɸernos)	ałuēs "fox"	Tosk dhelpër, Gheg dhelpen "fox" (< *dzelpina < *welpina)		ulipzas (ú-li-ip-za-aš) "wolf"; Luwian ú-li-ip-ni-eš (nom. sg.), wa-li-ip-ni (dat.-loc. sg.) "fox"
*ǵʰh₂éns "goose"	goose (< OE gōs), gander (< OE ganra)	OHG gans "goose"	(h)ānser "goose"	kʰḗn, Doric khā́n "goose"; Myc ka-no, ka-si (dat. pl.) "goose"	haṁsá- "goose" (cf. Hamsa)	Av zāō "goose" (? not in Pokorny); Sogdian z'γ "kind of bird", NPers ɣaz "goose", NPers ɣu "swan"	Bulg gɤ̞ska "goose", OCS gǫsǐ "goose"	OPrus zansi "goose", Lith žąsis "goose"	OIr gēiss "swan" W gwydd "goose"		gatë "heron"	B kents- "bird (goose?)"	
*h₂énh₂t(i)s "duck"	Scot ennet "duck" (< OE ened)	OHG enita "duck"	ānas (gen. anatis) "duck"	nessa, netta "duck"	ātí- "waterfowl"	Ossetic acc "wild duck" NPers ordak "duck"	Russ. utka "duck"	OPrus ants "duck", Lith antis "duck"			rosë "duck"		
*h₁élh₁ēn "deer"				élaphos "deer"; Hom ellós "young of the deer"		Past osə́i "deer"	OSl jeleni "deer"; Russ oleni "red deer"	Lith élnias "red deer"; Lith élnė "hind" < *H₁elH₁ēniHx "hind, cow-elk"	NWel elain "hind" < *H₁elH₁ēniHx "hind, cow-elk" OIr elit "doe"	ełn "hind"		B yal, ylem "gazelle" B ylaṃśke "young gazelle"	aliya(n)- "red deer"
*h₁eǵʰis "hedgehog"	OE igil "hedgehog" (< Proto-Germanic *igilaz)	ON ígull "sea-urchin"		MycGr e-ki-no; ekhînos "hedgehog"		Oss wyzyn "hedgehog"	OSl jezĭ "hedgehog"; Rus ež "hedgehog"	Lith ežȳs "hedgehog" (Note: Cf. also Phry ἔξις or ἔζις (ezi) "hedgehog".)		ozni "hedgehog"	esh, eshk "porcupine, hedgehog"		
*bʰébʰrus "beaver" (See also *bʰer-, bʰerH-)	beaver (< OE beofer)	OHG bibar "beaver"; OIc biorr "beaver"	fīber "beaver"		babʰrú "mongoose"	Av baβra- "beaver"	Pol bóbr "beaver"	Lith bebrùs "beaver"; Pruss bebrus "beaver"	Gaul bebru-; OIr Bibar				
*h₃érō "eagle"	erne "a sea eagle" < OE earn "eagle"	ara "eagle"; OHG arn "eagle"	(Avernus "entrance to the underworld" (< AncGrk áornos "birdless")) (Note: In ancient Roman tradition, the Avernus was a lake where birds died as they flew near it.)	órnis "bird"; Myc o-ni-ti-ja-pi "decorated with birds(?)"			OSl orǐlŭ "eagle"; Rus orël "eagle"	Lith ăras, ĕras, erẽlis "eagle"; Latv ērglis, OPrus arelie "eagle"	MBret erer, MW eryr, MIr irar "eagle" (< *eriro)	OArm oror "gull", MArm urur "kite"	orr "eagle, falcon" (rare)		Hitt ḫaran- "eagle"; CLuw ḫarrani(a/i) "a type of (oracular) bird"; Pala [ḫa-]a-ra-na-aš "eagle"
*h₂éngʷʰis; *h₁ógʷʰis "snake", "serpent", "eel"		OHG unc "snake"; engiring "maggot" (diminutive of angar "large larva")	anguis "snake, serpent, dragon"; Anguilla "eel"	ópʰis "serpent, snake"; énkhelus "eel" (Note: See also Illyrian tribal name Enchele "eel-people".)	áhi "snake, serpent; name of Vrtra"	Av aži "snake", Persian yağnij "grass snake" (archaic); Azhi Dahāka (Note: The name migrated to Eastern Europe, assumed the form "azhdaja" and the meaning "dragon", "dragoness" or "water snake" in Balkanic and Slavic languages.)	OEstSl užĭ "snake", Rus už "grass snake"; Pol węgorz "eel"	OPrus angis "snake", angurgis "eel"; Lith angis "viper, adder", ungurys "eel"; Latv odze, odzs (dialectal) "viper, adder";		OArm awj "snake", iž, iwž "viper"		B auk "snake"	Illuyanka "mythical snake foe"
*h₂eyǵ- "goat"				aíx "goat"	eḍa "a kind of sheep"			(possibly) Lith ožỹs "goat"		ayts "goat"	dhi, "goat"		
*h₂ōwyóm (a vṛddhi-derivative of *h₂éwis) "egg"	ey (obsolete) "egg" (< OE ǣġ) (> Cockney "cock-egg"); egg (< ON egg)		ōvum "egg" (> ovum, ovary, oval, ovoid, ovulate, etc.)	ōión "egg, seed"		Past hagə́i "egg"	Pol jajo "egg"		W wy "egg"				
*h₂egʷnós "lamb"	yean "to give birth to" (< OE ēanian)		agnus "lamb"	amnós "lamb"			OCS agnę "lamb"		W oen "lamb"		enjë (dairy goat)		
*péysk- "fish"	fish (< OE fisċ)	fisks "fish"	piscis "fish"						OIr íasc "fish"				
*dʰǵʰúHs "fish"				ikhthū́s "fish"				Lith žuvi̇̀s "fish"; Latv zivs "fish"		OAr jukn "fish"			
*laḱ-, laḱs- "to be spotted; salmon, trout"	lax (< OE leax "salmon")	OHG lahs "salmon"				Osset. læsæg	Russ losos "salmon"	Lith lašiša "salmon"; Latv lasis "salmon"				B laks "fish, salmon"	

== Food and farming ==
PIE	English	Gothic	Latin	Ancient Greek	Sanskrit	Iranian	Slavic	Baltic	Celtic	Armenian	Albanian	Tocharian	Hittite
*ǵr̥h₂-nó- "grain" (See also *gʰreh₁-)	corn (< OE corn "grain")	kaúrn "corn"	grānum "grain" ⇒ (Note: grain, granary, granule, granite, pomegranate, etc.)		jīrṇá-, jūrṇá- "old, worn out, decayed"		OCS zrŭno "grain"	OPrus zirni "grain", Lith žirnis "pea"	OIr grān, W grawn "grain"	cʿorean "wheat, grain, corn"	grurëTosk grun, gruni Gheg "grain"		
*gʰreh₁- "to grow" (See also *ǵr̥h₂-nó-)	grow (< OE grōwan); green (< OE grēne); grey, gray (< OE grǣġ); grass (< OE græs); groom (young boy, servant) (< ME grome)	grōdjan "to green, grow; plant"	grāmen "grass, turf; herb"; rāvus "gray, tawny"; herba "grass; weed; herb"			Kurd gewre, gir "big", gewre bûn "to grow, to get big", giran "heavy", girîng "important, major, essential" Past grān "expensive, hard"	OCS grěnŭ "green"						
*h₂éǵros "field"	acre (< OE æcer "field")	akrs "field"	ager (agrī) "field" ⇒ (Note: agrarian, agriculture, pilgrim, peregrinate, etc.)	agrós "field"	ájra-"meadow"					art "soil"	arë "field"		
*h₂erh₃- "to plow"	OE erian "to plow"	arjan "to plow"	arō (arāre) "to plow", arātrum "plow"	aróō "I plow" < *H₂erH₃-oH₂, árotron "plow", aroura "arable land"			OCS orjǫ (orati) "to plow", ralo < *ar(ə)dhlom "plow"	OPrus artun "to plow", Lith arti "to plow"; arklys "horse"	MIr airim "I plow", W arddu "to plow" < *arj-; MIr arathar, W aradr "plow" < *arətrom < *H₂erH₃-trom	ara-wr "plow"	arë "arable land" *H₂r̥H₃-uer-	AB āre "plow"	
*h₂melǵ- "to milk"	milk (< OE meolc, mioluc)	miluks (miluks) "milk"	mulgeō (mulgēre) "to milk" ⇒ (Note: promulgate, emulsion, etc.)	amélgō "I milk"	mā́ršti, mā́rjati, mr̥játi "(he) wipes, cleans"	Av marǝzaiti, mǝrǝzaiti "(he) grazes (barely touches)"	OCS mlěko "milk", Russ. CS mŭlzu (mlěsti) "to milk"	OPrus milztun "to milk", Lith melžti "to milk"	W blith "milk, dairy produce; full of milk", MIr bligim "I milk" < *mligim, melg "milk"		miel, mil "I milk"	A malke B malk-wer "milk"	
*melh₂- "to grind"	meal (< OE melu); malm (< OE mealm)	malan "to grind"	molō (molere) "I grind"; mola "millstone; mill; ground meal, flour" ⇒ (Note: molar (tooth)); immolō "I immolate, sacrifice (lit. sprinkling flour on animals to be sacrificed)" ⇒ (Note: immolate); malleus "hammer, mallet" ⇒ (Note: maul, mallet, malleable); milium "millet"	múllō "I grind"; malthakós, malakós "soft, tender; gentle; mild"; melínē "millet"	mr̥ṇāti, mr̥nati "(he) grinds"	Av mrāta- "tanned soft"	OCS meljǫ (mlětĭ) "to grind"; mlatŭ "hammer"; molĭ "moth"; mělŭ "chalk; fine ground substance"	OPrus maltun "to grind", Lith malti "to grind", malnos "millet"	OIr melim "I grind"; W malu "grind"	mał "sieve" mał-em "I grind, crush"	mjell "flour"	A malywët "you press"; B melye "they trample"	mallai "grinds"
*kwh₂et- "to ferment, become sour"	OE hwaþerian "to roar, foam, surge"	ƕaÞō "froth, foam, scum"	cāseus "cheese" (> cheese)		kváthate "it boils"		OCS kvasŭ "leaven; sour drink" > Kvass						
*yew- "to blend, mix, knead"		ON ostr "cheese"; ysta "to curdle"	iūs "gravy, broth, soup; sauce; juice" > juice	?zōmós "soup, sauce; grease" ⇒ (Note: Spanish 'zumo' via Arabic)	yūṣa- "soup, broth; water in which pulses are boiled"		Russ uxá "Ukha"		W uwd "porridge"				
*bʰrewh₁- "to boil; to brew"	brew (< OE brēowan); burn (< OE biernan, beornan); bread (< OE brēad); broth (< OE broþ)		ferveō "I burn, I'm hot" ⇒ (Note: fervent, fervor, fervid, effervescence); fermentum "fermentation, leavening; ferment; anger"				OCS burja "storm"		Borvo "Gaulish deity of healing springs", W berwi "to boil"				
*gʷréh₂wō "quern, millstone"	quern (< OE cwerne)	*qairnus			grā́van "stone, rock, stone for pressing out the Soma juice"		OCS žrĭny "millstone"		Bret breo, breou, W breuan "quern"				
*mélit, *melnés "honey"	mildew (< OE mele-dēaw "honeydew")	miliþ "honey"	mel (mellis) "honey" (> mellifluous)	méli (mélit-) "honey"; Att mélitta "bee"; Myc me-ri, me-ri-to "honey"	milinda "honey-bee"				OIr mil, W mêl "honey"	mełr "honey"	mjal, mjaltë "honey"		milit "honey"; CLuw ma-al-li "honey"; Pala malit- "honey"
*médʰu "honey", "mead"	mead (< OE medu)	midus "mead"	mēdus "a type of mead"	métʰu "wine"	mádʰu "sweet drink, honey"	Proto-Iranian mádu "honey, wine"	OCS medŭ "honey"; Bulg med "honey"	OPrus meddu "honey", Lith medus "honey", midus "mead" (via Gothic); Ltg mads "honey"	OIr mid "mead"; W medd "mead"			B mit "honey"	CLuw maddu- "wine" (originally "sweet drink")
*tuh₂rós "cheese"	butter (< Gk. boútūros "cow cheese")			tūrós "cheese"									
*séh₂ls "salt"	salt (< OE sealt)	salt "salt"	sāl (salis) "salt" ⇒ (Note: saline, salsa, sauce, salad, sausage (salchicha, saucisse), salami, salary)	háls (halós) "salt"	sal-ilá- "salty"		OCS solǐ "salt"; OCS sladŭkŭ "sweet"; Russ sólod "malt"	OPrus sals "salt", Lith saldus "sweet	OIr salann, W halen "salt"	ał "salt"	ngjel-bëtë, ngjel-mëtë "salty", njel-m "to be salty"	A sāle, B salyiye "salt"	
*seh₁- "to sow (seed)", *séh₁mn̥ "seed"	sow (< OE sāwan), seed (< OE sēd "that which is sown")	saian "to sow"; OHG sāmo "seed"	serō (serere) "to sow" < *si-sH₁-oH₂, sēmen "seed" ⇒ (Note: semen, seminar, seminary, seminal, disseminate, inseminate, season, sative, etc.)		sasá- "corn, herb, grass", sasyá- "corn, grain, fruit, crop of corn", sī́ra- "Saatpflug" (seed plow?)		OCS sějǫ (sějati) "to sow", sěmę "seeds"	OPrus situn "to sow", simen "seed", Lith sėti "to sow", sėkla "seed", sėmuo "linseed"	OIr sīl, W hil "seed" < *seH₁-lo-	sermn "seed"			isḫūwāi "(he) sows"
*yugóm "yoke" (See also *yewg-)	yoke (< OE ġeoc)	juk "yoke"	iugum "yoke"	zugón "yoke"	yugá·m "yoke"	Av yaoj-, yuj- "to harness" Past yə́wa "plough"	OCS igo "yoke"	OPrus jugtun "yoke", Lith jungas "yoke"	W iau "yoke"	luc "yoke"		A yokäm "door"	yugan "yoke"
*yéwos "cereal, grain; spelt, barley"				Epic zeiā́ "einkorn wheat"; Cretan deaí "barley"	yáva "grain, cereal; barley"	Av yauua- "cereal"; Pers jow "barley, grain"; Oss jäv "corn, grain"	Rus ovín "barn, granary"; (Note: See also Ovinnik 'a spirit of the barn'.) Pol jewnia, jownia (dialectal) "granary"	Lith jãvas "a type of cereal"; javaĩ (pl.) "cereals"; Latv javs, java "infused (with fermentation)"	Ir eorna "barley"			B yap "dressed barley"	e(u)wa(n) "cereal (a kind of barley)"
*mḗms "meat"		mimz "flesh"	membrum "limb, member" < mēms-rom "flesh" ⇒ (Note: member, membrane)		mā́ṃs, māmsá- "meat"		OCS męso "meat"			mis "meat"	mish"meat"		
*h₂ébōl "apple"	apple (< OE appel)	apel	(Osc Abella "town name")				OCS ablŭko "apple"	Lith obuolys "apple", OPr wobalne "apple"; Latv ābols "apple (fruit)", ābele "apple tree"	Gaul Aballo "place name"; OIr aball, W afall, OBr aball(en) "apple tree"				

== Bodily functions and states ==
PIE	English	Gothic	Latin	Ancient Greek	Sanskrit	Iranian	Slavic	Baltic	Celtic	Armenian	Albanian	Tocharian	Hittite
*h₂enh₁- "to breathe"	OE ōþian "breathe hard" < PGerm *anþōjanã	*uz-anan "to expire"; ON anda "to breathe"; DE atmen "to breathe"	anima "breath"	ánemos "wind"; Anemoi "(deified) winds"	ániti "(he) breathes"; ātmán "breath, soul, life"	Av ā̊ntya, parā̊ntya (gen.) "breathing in and out"; Kurd henase "breath"; henas dan "to breath"	OCS vonja "smell" < *h₂en-yeh₂		OIr anāl "breath" < *h₂enh₁-tlo- ; W anadl "breath"	hołm "wind", anjn "person"	Gheg âj Tosk ēnj "I swell"	AB āñm- "spirit", B añiye "breath", B anāsk- "breathe in"	
*swep- "to sleep", *swépnos "dream (n.)"	archaic sweven "dream, vision" (< OE swefn); NoEng sweb "to swoon" (< OE swebban "to put to sleep, lull")	ON sofa "sleep (v.)"; Svafnir "Sleep-Bringer (a name of Odin)"	somnus "sleep (n.)"; sōpiō (v.) "make asleep"	húpnos "sleep (n.)"; Hypnos "god of sleep"	svápna- "sleep, dream (n.)"	Av xᵛafna- "sleep (n.)" NPers xwāb- "sleep"; Kurd xew "sleep" Past xob "dream, sleeping"	OCS sŭpati "sleep (v.)", sŭnŭ "sleep (n.), dream (n.)"	OPrus supnas "dream", Lith sapnas "dream"	OIr sūan, W hun "sleep (n.)"	kʿnem "I sleep", kʿun "sleep (n.)"	gjumë "sleep (n.)"	TA ṣpäṃ, TB ṣpane "sleep (n.), dream (n.)"	sup-, suppariya- "to sleep"
*der-, *drem- "to sleep"			dormiō "I sleep"; ⇒ (Note: "dorm, dormitory, dorter")	darthánō "I sleep" (epic)	drā́yati "(s/he) sleeps"; nidrā́ "sleep, slumber, sleepiness, sloth"		OCS drěmati "to doze, drowse, slumber"						
*bʰewdʰ- "to be awake, be aware"	bid (< OE bēodan); bede (< OE bēden); bead (< OE bedu); bode (< OE bodian)	anabiudan; DE bitte "please" (< bitten, "to beg")		punthánomai "I learn"	bódhati "(s/he) is awake"; bodháyati "(s/he) awakens, arouses"; buddhá- "awake"	Av baoδaiti "to be aware", Past póha "understand" NPers bidar "awake"	OCS bljusti "to watch"; buditi "to wake (someone) up"; bŭždrĭ "alert, cheerful";	Lith budėti "to stay awake, to guard"; busti "to wake up"					
*sweyd- "sweat"	sweat (< OE swǣtan "to sweat")	ON sveiti	sūdor "sweat (n.)"	(e)ĩdos "sweat (n.)"	svḗda- "sweat (n.)"	Av xᵛaēda- "sweat (n.)"; Kurd xwê, xoy "sweat" Past xoẓ̌ "sweet"		Latvian sviêdri (pl.) "sweat (n.)"	W chwys "sweat (n.)" < *swidso-	kʿirtn "sweat (n.)"	dirsë, djersë "sweat (n.)" < *swí-drō^{x}ty-	B syā-lñe "sweating" < *swid-yé-	
*h₁ed- "to eat"	eat (< OE etan)	itan "to eat"	edō (ēsse) "to eat", ēst "(he) eats"	édō "I eat", Homeric athematic infinitive édmenai "to eat"	ádmi "I eat", átti "(he) eats"	Av subj. aδāiti "(he) should eat"	OCS jamĭ "I eat" < *H₁ēd-mi, jastŭ "(he) eats"	OPrus istun "to eat", Lith ėsti "to eat (as or like an animal)	OIr ci-ni estar "although he doesn't eat"; W ys "eats" < *H₁ed-ti	utem "I eat" < *ōd-	ha "to eat"		ēdmi "I eat"
*peh₃- "to drink"	potable (< OF potable) imbibe (< Lat. bibere "to drink" via OF imbiber) potion, poison (<Lat. potio, potionis "a drink" via OF pocion, poison)		bibō (bibere) "to drink", pōtus "drink (n.)"; pō·culo- < pō·clo- < *pō·tlo- "beaker" (Note: Lit. drinking implement) (Compare Skt pā·tra-)	pī́nō, pépomai "I drink"	pā́ti, píbati "(he) drinks"; pā·tra- "cup, vessel"	Av vispo-pitay- "alltränkend" giving water/drinks to all	OCS pijǫ (piti) "to drink", pivo "drink, beer, beverage"	OPrus putun "to drink", puja "a party", Lith puota "party"	OIr ibid "drinks" < *pibeti; W yfwn "we drink"	əmpem "I drink"	pī "I drink"		pāsi "he swallows"
*ǵews- "to test, to taste"	choose (< OE ċēosan)	Goth kiusan "to prove, to test", kausjan "taste"; OHG kiosan "choose"	gustus "taste"	geúomai "taste"	juşate, joşati "enjoys"	Av zaoś- "be pleased"	OCS (vŭ)kušati "to offer a meal, to give for tasting"		OIr do-goa "choose"		zgjedh "choose" desha "I loved"; dashje "liking, taste, preference" (< PAlb *dāusnja)		kukuš(-zi) "taste"
*ǵenh₁- "to beget, give birth, produce"	kin (< OE cynn "kind, sort, family, generation") (> kindred); kind (< OE (ġe)cynd "generation, nature, race, kind"); king (< OE cyning); OE cennan "produce"	-kunds "born"; knoþs "race, people"; OHG kind "child"; Ger könig, Dut koning "king" (< PGmc *kuningaz = *kunją "kin" + *-ingaz "from, belonging to") (> OCS kŭnędzĭ "prince"; Lith kùnigas "priest"; Fin, Est kuningas "king" (esp. in chess))	(g)nāscor "I am born, begotten; grow, spring forth"; gignō "I beget, bear, bring forth, engender" ⇒ (Note: progeny, progenitor); (g)natus "born, arisen, made" ⇒ (Note: nee (Note: Via French né, née)); nāscēns "being born, arising; emerging" ⇒ (Note: nascent); nātīvus "created; imparted by birth" ⇒ (Note: native, nativity, etc.); nātīvitās "birth" ⇒ (Note: Spa Navidad "Christmas"); nātūra "nature, quality, essence" ⇒ (Note: nature, natural, etc.); nātiō "birth; race, class; nation, folk" ⇒ (Note: nation, national, etc.); nātālis "relating to birth, natal" ⇒ (Note: Natalia, Natalie, Natasha, Noël, etc.); genus (generis) "birth, origin; kind; species; (grammar) gender" ⇒ (Note: general, generic, generate, generous, congenital, degenerate, gender, genre, etc.); gēns (gentis) "tribe; folk, family; Roman clan" ⇒ (Note: gent, gentle, gentleman, gentile, genteel, etc.); ingēns "huge, vast; extraordinary"; genitus "begotten, engendered" ⇒ (Note: genitive, primogeniture, etc.); genius "inborn trait, innate character; talent, wits" (> genius); ingenuus "natural, indigenous; freeborn" ⇒ (Note: ingenuous, ingenu, ingenue); ingenium "innate quality, nature, disposition; natural capacity; talent" ⇒ (Note: ingenious, engine, engineer, gin (instrument, as in cotton gin), etc.); indigenus = indu (inside) + genus "native, indigenous" (> indigenous); genimen "product, fruit; progeny"; germen (germinis) "shoot, sprout; germ, origin, seed; fetus" ⇒ (Note: germ, germinate, germane, etc., but not German); genitor "begetter, father, sire"; genetrīx "begetter, mother"; naevus "birthmark, mole" (> Lat Gnaeus); genitālis "relation to birth, generation; productive" ⇒ (Note: genitals, genitalia)	geínomai "I am born; I beget"; gígnomai "I come into being; become"; gonḗ "offspring; seed" (> gonad); geneā́ "birth; race, descent; generation; offspring" (> genealogy, etc.); gnōtós "kinsman"; génos "offspring, descendant, family; nation, gender"; génna, génnā "descent, lineage; origin, offspring"; génesis "origin, source, manner of birth" ⇒ (Note: genesis, genes, genetic, etc.); gónos "fruit, product; race, descent; begetting; seed"; genétēs, genétōr "begetter, ancestor; father"	jánati "(she) gives birth"; jáyate "is born; becomes"; já-, -ja- "born; born of, begotten from", e.g., dvi·já- "twice-born"; jantú "child, offspring; creature"; jñāt́í "kinsman, relative"; jananī "mother, birth-giver"; jána- "people, person, race"; jánana- "begetting, birth"; jánas "race, class, genus"; jánman, janmá- "birth, life"; jániman "generation, birth, origin"; janitṛ́ "begetter, father, parent"; jánitrī "begetter, mother"; janátā "people, folk, generation"; jātí "birth, form of existence fixed at birth, position assigned by birth, rank, lineage, caste"	Av zīzǝnti, zīzanǝnti "they give birth"; Kurd zayîn "to give birth" Past zeẓ̌edə́l "to be born"	OCS zętĭ "son-in-law"		OIr -gainethar "who is born" < *ĝn̥-ye-tro; W geni "to be born"	cnanim "I am born, bear"	dhëndër, dhândër "son-in-law, bridegroom" < *ĝenH̥₁-tr- (Note: Cf. Sanskrit janitár-, Greek genetḗr, genétōr, Latin genitor "procreator".)	AB kän- "to come to pass (of a wish), be realized"	
*sewh₁- or *sewh₃- "to bear, beget, give birth" (See also *suHnú-)					sū́te "(she) begets"; sūtá- "born, brought forth"; sūtí "birth, production"	Av hunāhi "give birth, beget"			OIr suth "produce, offspring; milk"				šunnai "fills"
*h₂ewg-, h₂weg- "to grow, increase"	eke (< OE ēacian "to increase"); wax (of the moon) (< OE weaxan "to grow")	aukan, auknan "to increase (intr.)", wahsjan "to grow" < orig. caus. *h₂wog-s-éy-onom	augeō (augēre) "to increase (tr.)" ⇒ (Note: auction, etc.); auctor "grower - promoter, producer, author etc" ⇒ (Note: author, etc.); augmentum "growth, increase" ⇒ (Note: augment, etc.); augur < augos "aggrandizement" ⇒ (Note: augury, inaugurate, etc.); augustus "majestic, venerable" ⇒ (Note: August, etc.); auxilium "help, aid; remedy" ⇒ (Note: auxiliary, etc.)	a(w)éksō "I increase (intr.)", aúksō, auksánō "I increase (tr.)"	úkṣati "(he) becomes stronger", vakṣáyati "(he) causes to grow"; ójas, ōjmán "strength, vitality, power"; ugrá- "immense, strong, hard";	Av uxšyeiti "(he) grows", vaxšaiti "(he) causes to grow"	OCS jugъ "south" (the direction to where the Sun rises)	OPrus augtwei "to grow", Lith augti " to grow"	OIr fēr, W gwêr "fat" < *weg-	ačem "I grow, become big"		A oksiṣ "(he) grows"; A okṣu, В aukṣu "grown"	
*weǵ- "fresh, strong; lively, awake"	wake (< OE wacian); watch (< OE wæċċan)	gawaknan "wake up, arouse"	vegeō (vegēre) "be alert, awake, smart"; vigor "id"; vigil "awake, watching"		vā́ja- "strength, energy, vigour, spirit"; vájra- "hard; mace; thunderbolt; diamond"; vājáyati "(s/he) impels"								
*gʷih₃wo- "alive", *gʷih₃woteh₂ "life"	quick (< OE cwicu "alive")	qius "alive"	vīvus "alive"; vīta "life"	bíos, bíotos "life", zoo "animal"	jīvá-, jīvaka- "alive", jīvita·m, jīvā́tus, jīvathas "life"	Av gayō, acc. ǰyātum "life"; Gayōmart "living mortal"; -ǰyāiti- "life-"; Av ǰva-, OPers ǰīva- "alive", NPers ǰavān- "alive"; Kurd jiyan, jîn "life" Past žwənd "life"	OCS živŭ "alive", žitĭ, životŭ "life"; Živa "alive, living (Polabian deity)"	OPrus giws "alive", giwata "life", Lith gyvas "alive", gyvatė "snake"	Gaul biuo-, bio-, (Note: Seen in many personal or tribal names: Biuitoni, Biuonia, Dago-bius, etc); OIr biu, beo, W byw "alive"; OIr bethu (bethad), W bywyd "life" < Proto-Celtic *bivo-tūts	keam "I live" < *gʷi-yā-ye-mi		B śai- "to live" < *gweiH₃-ō	ḫuišu̯ant- "living; alive"
*ǵerh₂- "to grow old, mature" (See also *ǵr̥h₂-nó-, *gʰreh₁-)	churl (< OE ċeorl, ċiorl "free man")	Karl (< PGmc "free man") (> Slav korlǐ "king") (Note: This borrowing is found in almost every Slavic language and is said to be "without doubt the most famous Germanic loanword in Slavic" (Pronk-Tiethoff (2013)))		gérōn, gérontos "old; elder" (> geronto-); graûs "old woman"; geraiós "old"; géras "gift of honor"; gerarós "honorable, majestic, respectable"; Graîa; Graia > Graikós > Graeco-, Greek	járati, jī́ryati "grows old; wears out; is consumed, digested"; jīrṇá- "old, worn out; digested"; járan(t)- "old, infirm; decayed"; jarā́, jarás, jariman "old age"		OCS zĭrěti "to ripen"				grua "woman, wife" < PAlb *grāwā		
*mer- "to die"	murder (< OE morþor < *mr̥-tro-m)	maúrþr "murder"	morior (morī) "to die" < *mr̥-yōr, mortalis "mortal"	brotós (< *mrotós), mortós "mortal"	marati, máratē, mriyátē "(he) dies", mṛtá- "dead", márta-, mortal	Av merə- "to die", miryeite "dies"; OPers martiya- "man (someone who dies)", NPers mordan- "to die"; Kurd mirin "to die" Past mrəl "to die"	OCS mĭrǫ, mrěti "to die"	Lith miŕštu (miŕti) "to die", merdėti "to die slowly"	OIr marb, W marw "dead" < *mr̥-wós	meṙanim "I die", mard "human"			mert "died"
*kl̥H- "bald, naked"			calvus "bald, hairless" > calva "skull, scalp"		kulvá- "bald"	NPers kal, kačal "bald" kalle "head"							
*kʷeh₂s- "to cough"	whoost "cough" (< OE hwōstan)	German Hust "cough"				Kurd kuxin "to cough", kuxik "cough"	OCS kašĭljati "to cough"	Lith kosėti "to cough"	W pas "cough"	koll "cough"	kollë "cough"		
*perd- "fart"	fart (< OE feortan)			pérdomai	párdate "(s/he) farts"		Russian perdétь "to fart"	Lith persti "to fart"	W rhech "fart"	bert "fart"	pordhë "fart"		

== Mental functions and states ==
PIE	English	Gothic	Latin	Ancient Greek	Sanskrit	Iranian	Slavic	Baltic	Celtic	Armenian	Albanian	Tocharian	Hittite
*ḱlew(s)- "to hear"	listen (< OE hlystan), loud (< OE hlūd)	hliuma "hearing, ears (in pl.)"	clueō (cluēre) "to be named"; inclitus/inclutus "famous" (heard of)	ékluon "I heard"	śṛṇóti "(he) hears" < *ḱl̥-ne-w-; śrúti "that which is heard"	Av surunaoiti "(he) hears" < *k̂lu-n-	OCS slyšati "to hear"; slušati "to listen"	OPrus klausytun "to hear", Lith klausyti "to listen"	OIr ro-clui-nethar "hears"; W clywed "to hear"; Gaul cluiou "I hear"	lsem "I hear"	Old Tosk kluaj (standard quaj) "to call, to name" < *ḱlu(H)-eh₁-	A klyoṣ-, B klyauṣ- "to hear"	
*h₂ew- or *h₃ew- "to see, perceive, be aware of"	OE ēawis "obvious"		audiō "I hear, listen to; pay attention to" ⇒ (Note: "audio, audience, obey, obedience, auditorium, etc.")	aḯō "I perceive, hear, see, obey"; aisthánomai "I perceive, feel, apprehend, notice" ⇒ (Note: aesthetic)	āvís "evidently, manifestly, before the eyes, openly"		OCS aviti "to show, appear"	Lith ovytis "to appear"; ovyje "in reality"					
*weyd- "to see, find; to know"	wit (OE wit "intelligence", witan "to know" < PIE perfect tense)	witan "to know"	videō (vidēre) "to see"	é(w)ide "he saw"; perf. oĩda "I know (lit. I have seen)"	vindáti "(he) finds", ávidat "found"; vetti, vēdate, vidáti "(he) knows"; perf. véda "I know"	Av vī̆δaiti, vī̆nasti "(he) finds"	OCS viždǫ (viděti) "to see"	OPrus widatun "to see"; Lith veidas "face", išvysti "to see"	W gweld "to see", gwybod "to know"	gtanem "I find"			
*woyd- "to know"						Av perf. vaēδa "I know", vīdarǝ "they know"	OCS věmĭ (věděti) "to know"	OPrus waistun "to know", Lith vaistas "medicine", vaidila "pagan priest"	OIr find, W gwn "(I) know"	gitem "I know"		B ūwe "learned" < PToch *wäwen- < *wid-wo-	
*ǵénH₃-, *ǵnéH₃-sḱ-, *ǵn̥-né-h₃- "to recognize, know"	can (< OE cann "I know, he knows"), know (< OE cnāwan < *ǵnēH₃-yo-nom), Scot ken "to know" (< OE cennan "to cause to know" < PGerm *kann-jan)	kunnan "to know" < *ǵn̥-n-h₃-onom, kann "I know"	(g)nōscō ((g)nōscere) "to learn about", nōvī "I know" (lit. "I have learnt")	gignṓskō (aorist égnōn) "I learn about, perceive"	jānā́mi "I know" < *janā́mi < *ǵn̥-nh₃-mi	Av zanā-ṯ, zanąn < *ǵn̥-ne-h₃-ti; OPers a-dānā (impf.) "he knew" < *ǵn̥-ne-h₃-mi, xšnāsātiy (subj.) "he should know"; Kurd zanîn "to know"	OCS znajǫ (znati) "to know" < *ǵneh₃-yoh₂	OPrus zinatun "to recognize, know", Lith žinoti "to know"	OIr itar-gninim, asa-gninaim "I am wise"; W adnabod "(I) know"	čanačʿem, aorist caneay "I recognize"	njoh "I know" < *ǵnēh₃-sḱoh₂	A knā-, e.g. knānmaṃ "knowing" < *ǵneH₃-, kñas-äṣt "you have become acquainted" < *ǵnēH₃-s-	
*n̥- + *ǵneh₃-tos "not" + "to know"	uncouth (< OE uncūþ "unknown, strange")	unkunþs "unknown"	ignōtus, ignōrāntem "unknown, ignorant"	agnṓs (agnõtos) "unknown" < *n̥- + *ǵnéH₃-ts	ajñāta- "unknown"			OPrus nezinatun "not to know", Lith nežinoti " not to know"	OIr ingnad "foreign"	an-can-awtʿ "ignorant, unknown"		A ā-knats, B a-knātsa "ignorant"	
*lewbʰ- "to love; desire, covet, want; admire, praise"	love (< OE lufu); arch. lief "dear, beloved" (< OE lēof); lofe "praise, exalt; offer" (< OE lofian, lof)	lubō "love"	libet "it is pleasing, agreeable"		lúbhyati "(s/he) desires greatly; longs for, covets; is perplexed"; lobháyati "(s/he) causes to desire, attract, allure; confound, bewilder"; lobhá "perplexity, confusion; impatience, eager desire, longing; covetousness"; lobhin "greedy, desirous of, longing after; covetous"		OCS ljubiti "to love"; ljubŭ "sweet, pleasant"; ljuby "love"; Russ ljubímyj "favorite"				lyp "beg"		
*men- "to think"	mind (< OE (ġe)mynd "memory" < *mn̥t-ís); OE munan "to think"; minion	munan "to think"; muns (pl. muneis) "thought" < *mn̥-is; gamunds (gamundáis) "remembrance" < *ko(m)-mn̥t-ís	meminī "I remember" ⇒ (Note: memento); reminīscor "I recollect, remember" ⇒ (Note: reminisce) mēns (mentis) "mind" < *mn̥t-is; memor "mindful, remembering" ⇒ (Note: memory) commentus "devised, contrived; invented"; moneō "I remind, warn"; mōnstrum "a divine omen; portent" ⇒ (Note: monster); Minerva	mémona "I think of"; maínomai "I go mad"; mimnḗskō "I remind, recall"; mnáomai "I am mindful, remember; woo, court"; autómatos "self-willed, unbidden; self-moving, automatic"; ménos "mind; desire; anger"; Méntōr "mentor"; manthánō "I learn; know, understand; notices"; máthēma "something that is learned, lesson; learning, knowledge" ⇒ (Note: mathematics); Promētheús]	mányate "(he) thinks"; mántra- "thought, the instrument of thought"; mánas "mind"; máti "thought intention; opinion, notion; perception, judgement"; mantṛ́ "thinker, adviser"; medhā́ "wisdom, intelligence" (See mazdā); mantrín "minister, councilor, counselor" > mandarin	Av mainyeite "(he) thinks"; mazdā "wisdom, intelligence"; OPers mainyāhay "I think", NPers Došman- "Someone who has a bad mind"; Kurd mejî "brain, mind"	OCS mĭněti "to mean"; pamętĭ "memory"; myslĭ "thought"	OPrus mintun "to guess", minisna "memory", mints "riddle", mentitun "to lie", Lith mintis " thought", minti "to guess", minėti "to mention", manyti "to have an opinion"	OIr do-moiniur "I believe, I mean"		mendoj "I think"	A mnu "thought"; B mañu "demand (n.)"	memmāi "says"
*(s)mer- "to remember, care for, be concerned, fall into thinking"	mammer "to hesitate; to mumble, stammer from hesitation" (< OE māmrian, māmorian "to think through, deliberate, plan out"); mimmer "to dote, dream" (< OE mymerian "to keep in mind"); mourn (< OE murnan); OE mimor "mindful"	maurnan "be anxious"	memor "mindful, remembering" (Note: Derived by some from *men- "to think") ⇒ (Note: "memory, remember, etc."); mora "delay, any duration of time" ⇒ (Note: "mora, moratory, moratorium")	mérmeros "baneful, mischievous; captious, fastidious"; mérimna "care, thought; anxious mind"; mártus, márturos "witness" ⇒ (Note: "martyr")	smárati "(s/he) remembers, recollects"		Serbo-Croatian and Slovenian mar "care"						
*teng- "to think"	think (< OE þenċan, þenċean); thank (< OE þanc "thought, thanks")	þagkjan "think"	tongeō "I know"									A tuṅk, B taṅkw "love"	
*mers- "to bother, annoy, neglect, disturb, forget, ignore"	mar (< OE mierran)				mṛ́ṣyate "(s/he) forgets, neglects, disregards"			Lith miršti "to forget, lose, become oblivious"			mërzi "boredom" mërzit "bother, annoy"		
*sekʷ- "to see, to say"	see (< OE sēon); say (< OE sec̣gan < PGerm *sag(w)jan < *sokʷéyonom)	saíƕan "to see"; OHG sagen "say" < *sokʷē-	īnseque "declare!"	énnepe "tell!"	śacate "(he) says"		OCS sočiti "to announce"	Lith sakyti "to say", sekti "to tell a story, to follow"	OIr insce "I talk"; OIr rosc "eye" < *pro-skʷo-; OW hepp "(he) said"		sheh "(he) sees"	A ṣotre, B ṣotri "sign"	sakuwāi- "to see"
*derḱ- "to see"	ME torhte "bright, shining, radiant"			dérkomai "to see, see clearly; watch"; dérgma "look, glance; sight"	dṛś- "see"; (Note: standard present tense formed using a suppletive root) (Note: dekko) darśayati "to cause to see, to show"; dṛṣṭá- "seen, visible, apparent, noticed"				Oir : dearc ~tha).Look, behold; regard, consider; W edrych "look"		ndrri, ndrritje "bright, enlightened"		
*(s)péḱ- "to watch, be looking at, keep looking at"	spy (< Fk *spehōn "to spy")		-spex "watcher" > avispex, auspex "bird-watcher" ⇒; speciō "I observe, watch, look at" ⇒ (Note: aspect, inspect, respect, prospect, perspective, retrospect, despicable, conspicuous, perspicuous, perspicacious, spectacle, spectacular, etc etc.); speciēs "seeing, view, look; sight; appearance; point of view; kind, sort, type" ⇒ (Note: species, spice, special, specify, specific); specimen "mark, token; example, pattern, model"; spectus "look, appearance, aspect"; spectrum "appearance, image; apparition, spectre" ⇒ (Note: spectre, spectrum); speculum "looking-glass, mirror" ⇒ (Note: speculate)	skopéō "I look, behold; inspect" ⇒ (Note: scope, -scope, -scopy); skopós "watcher; proterctor, guardian" ⇒ (Note: bishop, episcopal); sképtomai "I look at; examine; consider, think"; sképsis "viewing; observation; doubt" ⇒ (Note: skeptic, skeptical, skepticism)	spáś "spy, watcher; messenger"; páśyati "(s/he) sees, looks, beholds"; spaṣṭá- "clear, visible; obvious, evident; intelligible"			Lith spoksoti "to stare"			shpik "invent" shpikje "invention, creation"		
*kʷeḱ- "to see; to show; to seem"				tékmar "goal, end; token"	kā́śate "(it) is visible, appears; shines"; √caks-, caṣṭe "to see, look; appear; inform"; cákṣu "eye"; cákṣman "seer"	Av cašman "eye"	OCS kazati "to show; say, testify"	Lith kušlas "having poor eyesight"					
*wekʷ- "to say"	OE wōma "noise" < *wōkʷ-mō(n)	OHG giwahanen "mention" < PGerm *gawahnjan (denom. built on *wokʷ-no-)	vocō (vocāre) "to call", vōx (vōcis) "voice"	eĩpon (aor.) "spoke" < *e-we-ikʷ-om < *e-we-ukʷ-om, (w)épos "word"	vákti, vívakti "(he) says", vāk "voice", vácas- "word"	Av vač- "speak, say", vāxš "voice", vačah "word", NPers vāk- "voice"; Kurd vaj "voice", bivaj- "to say"		OPrus enwackēmai "we call"	OIr foccul "word", W gwaethl "argument, verbal fight" < *wokʷ-tlo-m	gočem "I call"		A wak, B wek "voice"	ḫuek-, ḫuk- to swear to"
*bʰeh₂- "to speak, say"	ban (< PGmc *bannaną "to proclaim, order, summon")		fāma "fame"; fās "divine law; will of god, destiny"; for (fārī) "I speak, talk, say"; fātus "word, saying; oracle, prophecy; fate"; fateor (fatērī, fassus sum) "I confess, admit, acknowledge"; fābula "discourse, narrative; tale, fable"; Sp hablar, Pt falar "to speak"	phōnḗ "voice"; phḗmē "prophetic voice; rumor; reputation"; phēmí "I speak, say"; prophḗtēs "one who speaks for a god: proclaimer, prophet"; phásis "utterance, statement, expression"	bhā́ṣā "speech, language"; bhā́ṣati "(s/he) speaks"		bajka "fable"; (Note: all Slavic languages) OCS balii (bali) "physician, (healer, enchanter)"						
*preḱ-, *pr̥-sḱ- < *pr̥ḱ-sḱ- "to ask"	pray "to ask, request" Scot frain "to ask" (< OE freġnan)	fraíhnan "to ask"; OHG forscōn "to ask, to research"	precor (precārī) "to pray", poscō (poscere) "to demand, ask"		pṛccháti "(he) asks"	Av pǝrǝsaiti "(he) asks, desires" < *pr̥-sḱ-; OPers aor.? aparsam "(he) asked"; Kurd pirs "question" Past pox̌tə́l "to ask"	OCS prositi "to ask, to demand"	OPrus prasitun "to ask", Lith prašyti "to ask"	OIr imm-chom-arc "mutual questions, greetings"; NIr arco, W archaf "I ask"	harcʿanem "I ask"	pyet "ask" porosit "recommend, order" (an article or a meal)	A prak-, B prek- "to ask"	
*kelh₁-, (s)kel-dʰ- "to call, cry, summon"	haul (< OE halian); scold (< ON skald)		calō "I call, announce solemnly; call out"; concilium "a council, meeting" ⇒ (Note: council, conciliate, etc.); classis "the armed forces; fleet; group or class" > class; kalendae "the Calends" > calendar; clāmō "I cry out, clamor, shout, yell" ⇒ (Note: clamor, claim, exclamation, etc.); clārus "clear, bright; renouwned, famous; loud, distinct" ⇒ (Note: clear, clarify, etc.)	kaléō "I call, hail; summon, invite"	klándati, krándati "(s/he) laments weeps; cries; sounds"; uṣaḥkala-, uṣakala- "rooster, lit, dawn-call"	Kurd kalîn "to moan, to whine, to mourn", dikale "he/she mourns"	OCS klakolŭ "bell"; Russ skulítʹ "to whine, whisper"	Lith kalbėti "to speak"			Gheg kaj "weep, cry"		
*bʰeyh₂- "to fear, be afraid"	bive, bever "to shake, tremble" (< OE bifian)		foedus "foul, filthy, unseemly; vile"		bháyate "(s/he) is afraid"; bhī, bhīti, bhayá- "fear"		OCS bojati "to fear, be afraid"	Lith baimė "fear", bijoti "to fear"					
*h₁néh₃mn̥ or *h₁nómn̥ "name"	name (< OE nama)	namō (acc. pl. namna) "name"	nōmen "name"	ónoma "name"	nā́ma(n)(instrumental sg. nā́mnā) "name"	Av nāma "name"; NPers nām- "name"; Kurd nav "name" Past num "name"	OCS imę "name" < Proto-Slavic *inmen < *n̥men	OPrus emnes, emmens "name" < *enmen-	OIr ainmm n-, OW anu "name"; Gaul anuan < anman "name"	anun "name"	Gheg emën, Tosk emër "name" < *enmen-	A ñem, B ñom "name"	lāman- "name"

== General conditions and states ==
PIE	English	Gothic	Latin	Ancient Greek	Sanskrit	Iranian	Slavic	Baltic	Celtic	Armenian	Albanian	Tocharian	Hittite
*(s)teyg- "to be sharp; to sting"	stick (< OE sticca); stitch (< OE stiċe); thistle (< OE þistel)	stiks "point"	īnstīgō "I stimulate, incite, rouse" > instigate; stilus (later spelled stylus (Note: Under the misguided influence of Greek stûlos "pillar")) "pointed instrument, spike" ⇒ (Note: stylus, style (originally same meaning as stylus: a particular form of writing > style))	stizō "I tattoo; mark"; stíxis "marking; spot, mark"; stígma "mark, tattoo; spot, stain"	téjate "become sharp; energize"; téjas "sharp ede of a knife; light, brilliance, glow; splendor; fiery power"; tīkṣṇá "sharp; hot, fiery, pungent; acute, keen"; tigmá "sharp, pointed; pungent, scorching, acrid"	Per tez "sharp"							
*teh₂- "to melt, thaw; flow"	thaw (< OE þawian); thone "damp, moist, wet" (< OE þan)		tābēs "decay, foulness; fluid from a wound"; tābeō "I melt; rot"; tābum "gore; viscous fluid"	tîphos "pond, swamp"; tḗkō "melt"	tāmara "water"; toyam "water"; toś-, tośate "drip, distill, trickle"; tuṣāra "rain, mist, tickle, drizzle, wet"		OCS tajati "melt"		W toddi to melt				

== Natural features ==
PIE	English	Gothic	Latin	Ancient Greek	Sanskrit	Iranian	Slavic	Baltic	Celtic	Armenian	Albanian	Tocharian	Hittite
*h₂ster- "star" (See also: *h₂eHs-)	star (< OE steorra)	staírnō "star"	stēlla "star"	astḗr "star" (Note: Cf. Asteria (litt.) "starry one"; Astraeus "god of dusk" (litt. "starry"); Astraea "star-maiden"; Cretan king Asterion "starry".)	root stṛ (stá "star", stáras "stars"), contracted root tṛ (tārā "star")	Av acc. stā̆rǝm (ablauting) (Note: acc. stā̆rǝm, gen. stārō, pl. nom. staras-ča, stārō, acc. strǝ̄uš, gen. strǝ̄m, dat. stǝrǝbyō.) "star"; Kurd stêr "star"			MIr ser, W seren, Breton sterenn "star"; Celtic Sirona (< *Tsirona) "astral", "stellar"	astł "star"; Astłik "deity of love, fertility and skylight"		pl. A śreñ, B ściriñ "stars"	ḫasterza "star"
*dyḗws (Note: Complex ablauting stem: Language / Nom / Acc / Voc / Gen / Dat / Loc / Instr Pl; PIE / d(i)yḗws / dyḗm / dyéw / diw-és, -ós / diwéy / dyéwi and dyéw / ?; Greek / Zdeús / Zdẽn / Zdeũ / Di(w)ós / Di(w)í; Sanskrit / d(i)yāús / dyā́m / ? / divás, dyōs / divḗ / dyáví, diví / dyú-bhis) "day, daily sky → the sky god"; *déywos "heavenly → god"	Tues-day (< OE Tīwes-dæġ lit. "day of Tīw" (Note: Tīw < *déywos was the Germanic god of war, but originally was a sky-god and head of the gods, like Zeus.))	tiws "god", ON Týr "Tīw" (the war god)	Iuppiter (Iovis), Old Latin Diū-piter (Diovis) "Jupiter"; diēs "day", deus, dīvus "god" (Note: *déywos > Lat. deus; gen. *deiwī > Lat. dīvī. From each stem a full declension was formed.)	Zdeús (Di(w)ós) (Note: Complex ablauting stem: Language / Nom / Acc / Voc / Gen / Dat / Loc / Instr Pl; PIE / d(i)yēus / dyēum / dyĕu / diw-és, -ós / diwéi / dyéwi and dyēu / ?; Greek / Zdeús / Zdẽn / Zdeũ / Di(w)ós / Di(w)í; Sanskrit / d(i)yāús / dyā́m / ? / divás, dyōs / divḗ / dyáví, diví / dyú-bhis) "Zeus"	d(i)yāús (divás, dyōs) "heaven", dēvás "god", devī́ "goddess"	Av daēva- "demon"; Kurd dêw "giant"	(OCS dĭnĭ (dĭne) "day" < *din-is), Ukr. dyvo and Russ. divo "miracle"	OPrus deina "day", deiws "god", Lith diena "day", dievas "god"	OIr dīe, W dydd "day"; OIr dia (dē), OW duiu- "God"	tiw (tuənǰean) "day"	din "dawn" <PAlb *deina "day" zot "god" <PIE *dyew + *átta		Šiuš "Hittite sky- or sun-god" (Note: According to linguist Vitaly Shevoroshkin, the noun exists in other Anatolian languages: Lycian ziw-; Lydian civ-; Luwian Tiwa-; Palaic Tija-.)
*seh₂wol-, *sóh₂wl̥, *sh₂un- "sun"	sun (< OE sunne)	sauil, sunnō "sun"	sōl "sun"	Homeric hēélios "sun" < *sāwélios; (Note: Other dialectal variants are Cretan awélios or ābélios; Doric āélios.) Helios "deity of the sun"	súvar (súra-) "sun, light, heavens", sūra-, sūrya "sun"	Av hvarǝ (hūrō) "sun, light, heavens", Hvare-khshaeta "deity of the radiant sun"	OCS slĭnŭce "sun" < *sulnika-, Russ. po-solon' "sunwise"	OPrus sauli "sun", sawaiti "week", Lith saulė "sun"	OIr sūil "eye"; W haul "sun"		ylli "star" < *sūlo- or *sūli-	A swañceṃ; B swañco, swañciye "sunbeam" (< Common Tocharian *su̯āntœ)	^{D}UTU-li-ya "Sun goddess"
*meh₁ns- "moon, month"	moon (< OE mōna), month (< OE mōnaþ)	mēna "moon", mēnoþs "month"	mēnsis "month"	Att mḗn, Ion meis, Dor mḗs "month", mḗnē "moon"	mā́s "moon"; mā́sa "month"	Av mā̊ (mā̊ŋhō) "moon"; NPers māh "moon, month"; Kurd meh "month", mang "moon"	OCS měsęcĭ "moon, month" < *mēs-n̥-ko-	OPrus miniks "moon", mins "month", Lith mėnulis "moon", mėnesis "month"	OIr mī (mīs) "month" < *mēns;; W mis "month"	amis "month"	muai "month"	A mañ B meñe "month"; A mañ ñkät B meṃ "moon"	
*dʰeǵʰom- "earth" (See also *dʰǵʰmṓ)			humus "earth" ⇒ (Note: humble, humility, exhume, etc)	kʰtʰṓn (kʰtʰonós) "earth", kʰamaí "on the earth" (Note: Seen in chamomile (from khamaimēlon "earth-apple") and chameleon (from khamailéōn "earth-lion").)	kṣā́s (acc. kṣā́m, gen. jmá-) "earth"	Av zā̊ (acc. ząm, gen. zǝmō) "earth"; Kurd zevî "farmland"; NPers zamin "ground, soil", zamindar "land owner"	OCS zemĭ, zemlja "earth"; Russ Chernozem "black soil"	OPrus zemê "earth", semmai "on the earth" (adverb); Lith žemė " earth"	OIr dū "place"; Welsh dyn "man"		dhe "earth"	A tkaṃ (tkanis), B keṃ "earth"	tēkan (tagnās) "earth"
*h₂éḱmō "stone"	hammer (< OE hamer)			ákmōn "anvil"	áśman "stone"; aśmará "stony"	Asman "sky"	OCS kamy, gen. kamene "stone"	Lith akmuõ, gen. akmeñs "stone"					
*lep- "stone"			lapis "stone"	lépas "crag, bare rock"									
*wódr̥ (udéns) pl. *wédōr (udnés) "water"	water (< OE wæter)	watō (watins) "water"	Umbrian utur "water", Latin unda "wave"	húdōr (húdatos) "water"; Hydra (litt.) "water-animal"	udaká- (loc. udán(i), pl. udá), udra "water"; samudra "ocean" (litt. "gathering of waters")	Av aoδa- "spring", vaiδi- "stream"	OCS voda "water", Russ. vedro "bucket"; Russ vódka "vodka"	OPrus undan "water", Lith vanduo gen. vandens "water"	OIr u(i)sce "water" < *udeskyo-; Eng. Whisky < uisce beatha "water of life"	get "river"	ujë "water"	A wär, B war "water"	wātar (wetenas) "water"
*dóru, *drew- "wood, tree"	tree (< OE trēo)	triu "tree, wood"		dóru, drûs "tree, wood"	dā́ru, drṓs, drú- "tree, wood"	Av dāru- "tree, wood"; Kurd dar "tree, wood"	OCS drěvo "tree"	OPrus drawê "hole in a tree, hollow tree", Lith drevė "hole in a tree", derva "tar"	OIr daur "oak", W derwen "oak"	tram "firm"	dru "tree, wood"	AB or "wood"	taru "tree"
*h₂weh₁n̥to- "wind", *h₂weh₁- "to blow"	wind (< OE wind); OE wāwan "to blow"	winds "wind"; waian "to blow"	ventus "wind"	áenta (acc.) "wind", áēsi "(he) blows"	vā́ta- (vānt-) "wind", vāti "(he) blows", Vāyu "lord of winds"; nir·vāṇa- "blow-out, extinction"	Av vātō "wind", vāiti "(he) blows", Vayu-Vata "a pair of deities: Vayu/Wind and Vata/Air"; Kurd ba, wa, va "wind", hewa "air, weather"	OCS vějǫ (vějetŭ) "to blow", větrŭ "wind"	OPrus witra "wind"; Lith vėjas "wind", vėtra "heavy wind", Vėjopatis "god of winds"	W gwynt "wind"		vetëtin"it thunders"	A want, B yente "wind"	ḫūwanz "wind"
*sneygʷʰ- "to snow"	snow (< OE snāw < *snóygʷʰos, snīwan "to snow" < *snéygʷʰonom)	snáiws "snow"	nix (nivis) "snow", ninguō (ninguere) "to snow"	nípʰa (acc.) "snow", neípʰei "it snows"	sneha- "snow"	Av snaēža- "to snow"; Shughni žǝnij "snow" < *snaiga-	OCS sněgŭ "snow"	OPrus snaigs "snow", Lith sniegas "snow", snigti "to snow"	OIr snecht(a)e, W nyf "snow" (< *snigʷo-); OIr snigid "it rains"			B śin̄catstse "snowy" (< *śin̄ce ("snow") < *snígʷi)	
*h₁n̥gʷnís "fire" < *h₁engʷ- "to burn"; *h₁óngʷl̥ "charcoal"			ignis "fire"		agní "fire"; áṅgāra "charcoal"		OCS ognĭ "fire"; ǫglĭ "coal"	Lith ugnis "fire", anglis "coal" Lv uguns "fire"			e enjte "Thursday" <PAlb *agni "fire"		
*péh₂wr̥, ph₂unés "bonfire" (Note: It is unclear how the original PIE forms produced the attested daughter-language forms. After the loss of laryngeals, original *péh₂wr̥, ph₂unés would regularly produce *pāwr̥, punés. It is possible that this form was considered too strange-looking, with the result that the u vowel was borrowed from the second stem into the first, yielding *púwr̥, punés. This compressed to *pūr, punés, and this stem set, or its regularized version *pūr, purés, might form the basis of the Umbrian, Greek and Armenian forms. For Germanic, however, something else must be at work. Ringe (2006) suggests that the following sequence of events produced Gothic fōn: Collective péh₂wōr -> ph₂uṓr (cf. Tocharian B puwar) > puōr > Proto-Germanic fuwōr > fwōr > fōr -> fōn (using -n- from the oblique stem), where -> indicates a change due to analogy, while > indicates a regular sound change. His explanation of funins and fuïr is very tentative and complicated. Pokorny's suggestion for Germanic is rather different. He derives fōn from *fwōn, with no further derivation, but probably different from Ringe's. fuïr comes from *puweri, a locative that could be formed from a nominative *púwr̥ or possibly from a stem *pur-. It suffices to say that the processes involved are not well understood.)	fire (< OE fȳr < *fuïr)	fōn (funins) "fire"; OHG fuïr (two syllables) < *puwéri	Umbrian pir "fire" < *pūr, acc. purom-e "into the fire" < *pur-	pũr (purós) "fire"	pāru (pēru) "sun, fire"	NPers fer "oven, furnace"	Czech pýř "glowing ash", Pol perzyna "embers", Slovak pyr, UpSb pyr "ashes" Ukr para "steam (n.)"	OPrus pannu "fire"		hur "fire"		A por, B puwar, puwār, pwār "fire"	paḫḫur "fire"
*dʰuh₂mós "smoke" < *dʰewh₂- "to smoke"	dew (< OE dēaw)		fūmus "smoke"	thūmós "soul, life, breath; desire, temper"	dhūmá- "smoke; mist, fog"	Kurd du, dukêl	OCS dymŭ "smoke"	Lith dūmai "smoke"			tym "smoke" <PAlb ātuma		
*h₂eHs- "to become dry; burn, glow; hearth; ashes" (See also: *h₂ster-)	ash (< OE æsce);	azgō "ash; cinder"	āreō "I am dry; dried up, withered"; āridus "dry, parched, withered, arid" > arid; āra "altar; sanctuary, refuge"; assus "roasted, baked; dried"; Osc aasa "altar"	ázō "I dry"; ásbolos "soot"	ā́sa- "ashes, dust"							A/B ās- "to dry out; to dry up"	ḫašš- "ash; dust"; ḫašša- "hearth"; Lyc χaha-(di-) "altar"
*ken- "to rub, scrape off; ashes, dust"			cinis, cineris "ashes" ⇒ (Note: "incinerate, cinerary, cinerarium")	κόνις "ash, dust"	kaṇa- "particle; small grain of dust, rice, corn; atom"								
*gʷʰerm- "warm"	?warm (< OE wearm); OE ġierwan "to prepare, cook" < PGerm *garwjan	?warmjan "to warm"	formus "warm"	tʰermós "warm"	gʰarmá- "heat"	Av garǝma- "hot, heat"; OPers Garma-pada-, name of the fourth month, corresponding to June/July, orig. (?) "entrance of the heat"; Kurd germ "hot, warm"	Russ. žar "heat", goret' "to burn" < *gʷʰer	OPrus garmê "heat, glowing"	OIr gorn "fire" < *gʷʰor-nos, W gwres heat, warmth	ǰerm "warm"	Gheg zjarm "fire, heat" ngroh " I warm" ziej "I boil, cook" <PAlb *džernja	A śärme "heat (of summer)"	
*dʰegʷʰ- "to burn; warm, hot"			foveō "I warm, keep warm; nurture, foster"; fōmentum "a warm application; lotion"; ⇒ (Note: "foment, fomentation") fōmes "kindling, tinder" febris "fever"; ⇒ (Note: "fever, febrile") februum, februarius "expiatory offerings, means of purification"; ⇒ (Note: "February") (Note: Februārius mēnsis - Roman month of expiation)	téphrā "ashes"	dáhati "it burns"; dagdhá- "burned, burnt"		OCS žešti (žeg-) "to burn"; žigŭ "burn mark, brand"	Lith dė̃gis "burn scar", degti "to burn"			ndez "to light" djeg "burn"		
*h₁ews- "to burn";	ember (< OE ǣmyrġe)		ūrō "I burn, consume, inflame"; ustus "burnt, inflamed"; bustum < amb-bustum "a burial mound, tomb"; combūrō "I burn up, cremate, scald" > combust; ūrna "urn, water jar" (lit. a vessel of burnt clay)	heúō "I singe"	óṣati "(s/he) burns, burns down; punishes"; uṣṭá "burnt"; uṣṇá "warm, hot"								
*gel- "to be cold, to freeze"	cold (< OE ceald)	kalds "cold (of the weather)"	gelus "ice", gelidus "icy"		śarada "autumn"		MBulg goloti "ice"	Lith gelmenis, gelumà "great cold"					
*temH- "(to be) dark" *témHos "darkness"		OHG demar "twilight"	tenebrae "darkness" (< *temebrai < *temasro)		támas "darkness, gloom", támisrā "dark night"	Av taΘra "darkness", təmah- "darkness"	OCS tĭmĭnŭ "darkness", tĭma', Rus temnotá "darkness"	Lith tamsa "dark, darkness", tiḿsras "a darker shade of red"; Latv tumšs, timšs "dark", tùmsa "darkness"	OIr temel "darkness" (< PCel *temeslos); OW timuil "dark, darkness"			B tamãsse "dark"	
*nébʰos "cloud; mist"	OE nifol "dark [misty]"	ON Niflheimr "home of mists"	nebula "fog, cloud"	népʰos "cloud"; nepʰélē "mass of clouds; name of a nymph"	nábʰas "mist; sky, cloud"; nábʰāsa "celestial, heavenly; appearing in the sky"	nabah- "heavens" (litt. "nimbuses, clouds")	OCS nebo "heaven, sky"; Pol niebo "sky"; Cz nebesa "skies"; Rus Небеса "heaven"	Lith debesis "cloud", Ltv debesis skies, heavens	OIr nem "sky"; OBret nem, MBret neff "sky"		avull "steam" <PAlb *abula		nēpiš- "sky, heaven"; CLuw tappaš- "heaven"; HierLuw tipas- "heaven"
*lew- "dirt, mud"			lutum "dirt, clay, mud"; polluō "I soil, defile, foul" ⇒ (Note: pollute, pollution)	lûma "dirt, filth, smut; disgrace"				Lith liutýnas "loam pit"	OIr loth "mud"		lym "mud"		
*sámh₂dʰos "sand"	sand (< OE sand)		sabulō, sabulum "sand, gravel"	psámathos "sand, grains of sand"									
*srew-, *srew-mo, *sru-to "to flow, stream" (in river names) (Note: Cf. Thracian river name Struma and river-god Strymon; Illyrian toponyms Stravianae and Strevintia; Lith. (dial.) river name Straujà; Old Prussian place-names Strewe, Stromyke and Strowange. Stravianae (or Stravijanu) is tentatively located by scholars near the modern day city of Našice, in east Croatia.)	stream (< OE strēam)	ON straumr "a stream"		rheûma "flow"	srutá- "flow", srava "a flow of, a waterfall" (< *srówos)	YAv θraotah- "stream" (< OIA srótas-); OPer rautaʰ- "river"	OCS struja "stream", o-strovŭ "island"; (Note: The literal meaning is "place between the rivers".) Rus strumenı "brook"; Pol strumień "brook, river"	Lith srovė "current", sraumuõ "brook, stream", sraujà "current", sraũtas "flow, torrent"; Latv strāva "current", strauja "stream"	OIr sruaimm, Ir sruth "stream, river"; MW ffrwd "brook, stream"; OBret frut "stream"	OArm aṙu "brook; canal" (< srutis-)	rrymë "stream, current; flow (of water)"		
*dʰenh₂- "to set in motion, to flow"; *déh₂nu "river goddess"			fōns < PItal *ðonts "spring, fountain; fresh water; source"		dhánvati "it runs, flows, causes to run or flow"; dhána- "competition, contest; prize"; dā́nu "fluid, drop, dew"	Dnieper < OOss dānu apara "the far river"			Danube < PCelt *Dānowyos				
*dʰol- "valley, vault; curve, hollow"	dale (< OE dæl)	acc. dal "pit, valley"		thólos "vault"			OCS dolŭ "valley; depression"						
*móri "lake?, sea?" (Note: Scholarly opinion seems to agree that the word must have referred to a large body of water.)	OE mere "lake"	marei "sea"	mare "sea"		maryā́dā "shore; bank of a water body"		OCS morje "sea"	Lith mãrės "sea"	OIr muir "sea"; W môr "sea"; Gaul Morini "those from the sea (name of a tribe)"	OAr mor < mawr "mud, marsh, swamp"			
*louk-o- semantic field of open space	OE lēah "open land, meadow"	OHG lōh "overgrown clearing, low bushes"	lūcus "holy grove"		loka- "world, place"			OPrus laukas "field", Lith laukas "outside, field"					

== Directions ==
PIE	English	Gothic	Latin	Ancient Greek	Sanskrit	Iranian	Slavic	Baltic	Celtic	Armenian	Albanian	Tocharian	Hittite
*per- "through, across, beyond"	far (< OE feorr)	faírra "far"; faír- "around; (intensifier)"	per "through"	perí, pér "around"	pári "forward"	Av pairi; OPers pariy "forward"; Kurd ber "in front of, before"	OCS prě- "forward"	OPrus pro-, pra- "trough, across", Latvian pāri "across", Lith per "across", pra- "to start and finish doing something", pro- "through"	OIr ir-, W er "forward"	heṙu "far"	për, pej, pe "forward"		parā, Lycian pri "forth"
*upér(i) "over, above"	over (< OE ofer)	ufar "over, above, beyond"	super "over" (influenced by sub "under")	hypér (< *supér) "over"	upári "over, above, beyond"	Av 'upairi, OPers "over, above, beyond"	OCS po "upon, at"	OPrus uppin "cloud"	OIr for, W gor, gwar "over, on"	ver "up"	epër "over, above"		
*h₂ents "forehead", *h₂entí, *h₂entá "in front of"	and (< OE and)	and "along, throughout, towards, in, on, among"; OHG enti "previously" < PGerm *andiaz	ante "in front of"	antí "instead of"	anti "opposite to it"	Kurd enî "front, forehead"		Lith añt "on" antai "there"	OIr étan "forehead" < *antono-	ənd "instead of"	ende "yet, still" edhe "and" (< ênde)	A ānt, B ānte "surface, forehead"	ḫānz, ḫanti "in front"
*h₁én "in"	in (< OE in)	in "in, into, towards"	in "in"	en "in"	án-īka- "face" < ?*h₁eni-Hkʷ	Av ainika "face" < ?*h₁eni-Hkʷ	OCS on-, vŭn-, vŭ "in"	OPrus en "in", Lith į "in"	OIr in- "in"; W yn "in"	i "in"	në "in"	AB y-, yn-, B in- "in"	an-dan "inside"
*h₂epó "away"	of, off (< OE of)	af "from, of, by" (ab-u "from ...?")	ab "away"	apó "from"	ápa "away"	Av apa, OPers apa "away"	OCS ot, "from, apart of"	Lith apačià "bottom" < *apotyā			prapë "back" < *per-apë pa "without"		āpa "behind, back" (or ? < *epi)
*deḱs- "the right (side)"		Gothic taihswa "right side"	dexter	dexiós; Myc de-ki-si-wo	dákṣina "right, south"	Av dašina "right, south"; MPer dašn "right hand, right side"	OCS desnŭ "right (side)"	Lith dẽšinas	Gaul Dexsiva (Dexsiua), W de right, south		djathtë "right" <PAlb *detsa		
*marǵ-, *merǵ- "edge; boundary, border"	mark (< OE mearc); march (< OF markōn)	marka "border, bound, region"		margō (marginis) "border, edge" > margin	maryā "limit, mark, boundary"; mārga- "way, road, path"				W bro region, vale				
*bʰudʰmḗn "bottom"	butt (< OE bytt); bottom, botham (< OE bodan, botm)		fundus "bottom, ground, foundation; farm, estate"	puthmḗn "bottom (cup, jar, sea)"	budhná "bottom, ground, base, depth"				Gaul bona "base, bottom, village" (found in several placenames: Bonna > Bonn; Windo-bona "white village" > Vienna; Bononia > Boulogne(-sur-Mer))	an-dund "abyss, bottomless"	buzë "lip, edge" <PAlb *budza bythë "bottom"		

== Basic adjectives ==
PIE	English	Gothic	Latin	Ancient Greek	Sanskrit	Iranian	Slavic	Baltic	Celtic	Armenian	Albanian	Tocharian	Hittite
*bʰerǵʰ- "great, tall; hill, elevation"; *bʰérǵʰonts "high, mighty"	borough, borough, Brough, bur-, burg, burgh, bury, -bury (< OE burg, burh "city, town, fortification"); barrow (< OE beorg)	baurgs "castle, city", OHG burg "fortress, citadel"; OHG Burgunt (a female personal name)	fortis "strong, powerful; firm" ⇒ (Note: fort, forte, fortitude, fortification, force, effort, etc); LL Burgundia "Burgundy"; Fr Bourgogne		bṛhát, bṛhánt- "tall, elevated"; bráhman "lit. growth, expansion, development outpouring of the heart prayer, sacred word, mantra"; brahmán "worshiper"; barháyati "to invigorate"	Av barəzah‑ "height", Harā Bərəzaitī "a mythical mountain" (litt. "High Watchpost")	OCS brěgŭ "hill, slope; bank, shore"		MIr brí, MW bre, MBre bre, Gaul -briga "elevation, hill"; Gaul Brigantes (ethnonym); Celt Brigantia (name of a goddess), Ir Brigid (goddess) < PCelt *Brigantī "The High One"	barjr "high"		A pärk- "to elevate"; B pärkare "long"	parkuš "tall"
*weh₁-, *weh₁ros "true"	OE wǣr "true"	*wers as in allawerei "simplicity" Ger wahr Dut waar "true"	vērus "true" (> very, (Note: Replaced OE sār, compare Ger sehr) verify, verity, etc.)				OCS věra "faith, belief"		OIr. fír "true", W gwir "true"		urtë "quiet" <PAlb *wara		
*medʰyo- "mid, middle"	mid, middle (< OE mid, middel)	midjis "middle"	medius "middle"	més(s)os "middle"	mádʰya- "middle"	Av maiδya- "middle"	OCS meždu "between", Russ. meža "boundary"	OPrus meddin "forest" (between villages), Lith medis, Latv mežs "tree"	OIr mid- "middle" < *medʰu-; MW mei- "middle" < *medʰyo-	mēǰ "middle"	mes, mjet "in between, middle"		
*meǵ- "big"	much (< OE myc̣el "big, many")	mikils "big"	magnus "big"	mégas "big"	máha-, mahā́nt- "big"	Av mazant- "big"		OPrus mazs "smaller", Lith mažas "small"	OIr mochtae, MIr mag-, maige "big", MW mael "prince", W maes "field"	mec "big"	madh "big"	A mak, B makā "much"	mekkis "big"
*dlongʰos, *dl̥h₁gʰós "long";	long (< OE long, lang);	langs "long"	longus "long"	dolikhós "long, protracted";	dīrghá- "long"	Av darəga "long"	OCS dlĭgŭ "long";	Lith ilgas "long"			gjatë "long"		talugai- "long"
*gʷerH₂- "heavy"		kaúrus "heavy"	grāvis "heavy"	barús "heavy"	gurú- "heavy"	Av gouru- "heavy-", NPers girān "heavy" < *grāna- (influenced by *frāna "full")	OCS gromada "big size, huge", gruz "a load, something heavy",	OPrus garrin "tree"	MIr bair "heavy (?)", W bryw "strong"		zor "brute force; great effort"	A kra-marts "heavy (?)", B krā-mär "burden" < *gʷroH₂-mVr-	
*h₁le(n)gʷʰ-, *h₁ln̥gʷʰ-ro-, *h₁ln̥gʷʰ-u- (Note: *H₁le(n)gʷʰ- and *h₁rewdʰ- are both roots that form Caland-type adjectives. These roots are notable in that they form zero-stem adjectives with certain characteristic suffixes, especially -ro- and -u-, along with -i- in compounds. Other examples are *h₂erǵ- "white" (cf. Greek argós < *argrós "white", Sanskrit ṛjrá- "brilliant", Tocharian B ārkwi "white", Greek argi-kéraunos "with bright lightning") and *dʰewb- "deep" (cf. Lithuanian dubùs "hollow" < *dʰub-u-, Tocharian B tapre "high" < *dʰub-ro-).) "light (in weight)"	light (< OE lēoht)	leihts "light" < *h₁lengʷʰ-tos; OHG lungar "fast" < *h₁ln̥gʷʰ-ros	levis "light" < *h₁legʷʰ-us	elakʷʰús "small" < *h₁ln̥gʷʰ-us, elapʰrós "light, quick" < *h₁ln̥gʷʰ-ros	lagʰú-, ragʰú- "quick, light, small"	Av ragu-, fem. rǝvī "fast", superl. rǝnjišta- "fastest"	OCS lŭgŭkŭ "light"	OPrus langus "light", langsta "window", lankewingis "flexible", linktwei "to bend", Lith lengvas "light", lankstus "flexible", langas "window", lenkti "to bend"	OIr laigiu, laugu, MW llei "smaller"	lanǰ "breast"	lehtë "light-weight"	B lank_{u}tse "light"	
*h₂élyos, *h₂ényos "other"; *h₂énteros "second"	else (< OE elles); other (< OE ōþer)	aljis, anþar "other"	alius "other"	állos "other"	anyá-, ántara- "other"; aryas, Aryan, "else"	Av anya-, ainya-, OPers aniya- "other"; Av airiia, Aryan, "friend", "faithful", airiio "elsehow"; Ossetian ändär "other"; East Iranian hal-ci "whoever"	Old Sorbian wutory "other" < PSlav *ǫtorŭ	OPrus antars "second", Lith antras "second"	OIr aile, W ail "other"; Gaul allos "other, second"	ayl "other"	lloj "sort, type"	A ālya-k^{ə}, B alye-k^{ə} "another"	Lydian aλa- "other"
*néwo- "new"	new (< OE nīwe)	niujis "new"	novus "new"	né(w)os "new"	náva- "new"	Av nava- "new"	OCS novŭ "new"	OPrus nawas "new", Lith naujas "new"	OIr nūë, W newydd "new"	nor "new" < *nowero-		A ñu, B ñune "new"	newa- "new"
*h₂yuHn̥- "young"	young (< OE ġeong < *h₂yuHn̥ḱós)	juggs "young"	juvenis "young", iuvencus "young"/"bullock"		yúvan- (yū́nas) "young"	Av yvan-, yavan- (yūnō) "youth, young man"	OCS junŭ "young"	Lith jaunas "young"	OIr ōac "young", W ieuanc "young" < *H₂yuHn̥k̂ós				
*sen- "old"		sineigs "old (person)"	senex "old"	hénos "former, from a former period"	sánas "old"	Av hana- "old"	OCS sedyi "grey-headed"	OPrus sentwei "to get old", Lith senas "old"	OIr sen "old", Old Welsh hen "old"	hin "old"			
*nogʷ- "naked"	naked (< OE nacod "naked")	naqaþs "naked"	nudus "naked"	gumnós "naked"	nagnás "naked"	NPers loxt "naked"	OCS nagŭ "naked"	OPrus nags "naked", Lith nuogas "naked"	OIr nocht "naked"; W noeth "naked, bare"				nekumant- "naked, bare"
*bʰosós "bare, barefoot"	bare (< OE bær)						OCS bosŭ "barefooted, unshod"	Lith basas "barefooted"					
*n̥mr̥tós "immortal"				ámbrotos "immortal, divine"	amṛ́ta- "immortal"								
*h₂eḱ- "sharp"	edge (< OE eċġ)		aceō (acēre) "I am sour"; acidus "sour"; acētum "vinegar"; acus "needle, pin"; astus "craft, guile", astūtus "shrewd, astute"	akmé "point, edge"; oxús "sharp, pointed; quick; clever"	aśman "stone, rock; sharp one"	Persian āčār "pickle, marinade"	OCS ostĭnŭ "sharp point"	Lith aštrus "sharp, spicy", ašmuo "blade", akstinas "pointy and sharp item"	W eithin gorse		teh "blade" from eh "sharpen"		
*bel- "strong"			dēbilis (Note: contested) "feeble, weak"	βελτίων "better"	bála- "force, strength, power"		Russ bolʹšój "big, large, great"						

== Light and color ==
PIE	English	Gothic	Latin	Ancient Greek	Sanskrit	Iranian	Slavic	Baltic	Celtic	Armenian	Albanian	Tocharian	Hittite
*lewk- "light, brightness"	light (< OE lēoht)	liuhaþ (liuhadis) "light"	lūceō (lūcēre) "to shine", lūx "light"	leukós "bright, shining, white"; Leuce "white (poplar); name of a nymph"; Leucothea "bright goddess"	rócate "(he) shines", roká- "light",	Av raočant- "shining", raočah "light"; OPers raučah; NPers rowshan "light"; Kurd roj "sun, light, day", ron "light"	OCS luča "ray, flash" < *loukyā	OPrus lauk "bright", lauksna "star",	OIr luchair "shine"; W llachar "bright", llug "shimmer"	loys "light"		AB lyuk/luk- "to shine"	luk(k)- "to shine"
*bʰel- "to shine"	balefire (< OE bǣlfȳr)	ON bál "fire"	fulgeō "I flash, glitter"; flagrō "I burn, blaze"; flamma "flame, fire"	phlégō "I scorch, kindle"; Phlegyas "fiery"; Phlegethon "flaming"; phlégma "flame, inflammation"; phalós "white"	bhrája- "fire, shining"; bhāla- "splendor"		OCS bělŭ "white"	Lith baltas, Latv balts "fair, white"			balë "white spot"		
*h₂erǵ- "shining, bright" *h₂r̥ǵn̥tóm "white metal (silver)"			argentum "silver (metal)"; Fal arcentelom "a small silver coin"	Myc a-ku-ro, árguros "silver"; argós "white, bright"; (Note: Cf. also Thrac arzas "white".) Argiope "silver face"	Skt rajatá- "silver; silver-coloured"; árjuna- "white, clear, silvery"	Av ərəzatəm "silver"	Ru yarkiy "the bright one"; yarkostj "brightness"?		Celtib arkato[bezom] "silver [mine]"; Ir Airget[lám] "silver[-hand] (title of Nuada)"; OIr argat, OW argant "silver"	arcat' "silver"		A ārkyant "silver"; A ārki-, B ārkwi "white"	ḫarkiš "white, bright"
*ḱweyt- "to shine, white"	white (< OE hwīt)	ƕeits "white"			śvetá- "white; bright"; śvindate "to shine"; áśvitan "to become bright"	Av spaēta "white; bright"; NPers sefid "white"	OCS světŭ "light, world"; světiti "to shine, illuminate"; svĭtěti "to get bright"; svěšta "candle"; cvětŭ "bright color; bloom, flower"	Lith šviesà "light"; šviẽsti "to shine"					
*kr̥snós "black; dark, dusky"					kṛṣṇa- "black, dark, dark-blue" > Kṛṣṇa-	NPers kersne "dirt, dirty"	OCS črŭnŭ "black" ⇒ (Note: chernozem, chernukha, Cherno(byl))	Lith kir̃snas "black (of a horse)"; OPrus kirsnan "black"			sorrë "crow" <PAlb *tšārnā		
*h₁rewdʰ-, *h₁rowdʰ-os, *h₁rudʰ-rós "red"	red (< OE rēad < *h₁rowdʰ-os)	rauþs (raudis) "red" < *h₁rowdʰ-os	ruber "red" < *h₁rudʰ-rós; Umb rufru "red"	Myc e-ru-ta-ra, e-ru-to-ro; erutʰrós "red" < *h₁rudʰ-rós; Erytheia "name of a nymph" (litt. "the red one");	rudʰirá- "red" < *H₁rudʰ-rós mixed with *H₁rudʰ-i-; rṓhita- "red"; lōhá- "reddish" < *H₁roudʰ-os	Av raoiδita- "red"	OCS rudŭ "red"; Czech rudá "red"; (Note: Etymon rudá appears in idiomatic expressions denoting "anger".) Pol rudy "red-haired"	Lith raũdonas "red", raũdas "reddish-brown", rudas "brown"	OIr rúad, W rhudd "red", rhwd "rust"; Gaul Roud- (in personal names)		pruth "redhead" (< PAlb *apa-ruđa)	A rtär, B ratre "red" < *h₁rudʰ-rós	
*gʰel-, ǵʰelh₃- "green, yellow"	gold; yellow (< OE geolu); yolk (< OE ġeoloca)	gulþ "gold"	helvus "honey-yellow"; gilvus "pale yellow (of horses)" (Note: Latin etymons galbus ("yellow") and galbinus ("greenish-yellow") are also suggested to derive from this root.)	kʰlōrós "pale green"; (Note: See also: Phr glouros "gold".) Chloe "blooming; epithet of Demeter"	híraņya- "gold"; hári- "yellow"	Av zaranyam "gold"; zári "yellow"; Zarinaia < Saka *Zarinayā "the golden one [name of a queen]"	OCS zelenĭ "green"; Rus zóloto "gold"; Pol złoty "gold"; żółty "yellow"	Latv zèlts "gold"; Lith geltonas "yellow", geltas "yellow"; žel̃vas "golden"; žalias "green"	MWel gell "yellow"		? diell "sun" (cf. Dielli) <PAlb *delwa		
*ḱey- "grey, dark shade"	hue (< OE hīew "appearance, form; hue, color")	hiwi "form, show, appearance"			śyāvá- "dark; deep brown"; śyāmá- "dark, black, blue, brown, grey" ⇒ (Note: ?Siam)	Av siiāuua "dark" (cf. Siyâvash < Siiāuuaršan "the one with black stallions")	Pol siwy "grey"	Lith šývas "light grey"					
*bʰer-, bʰerH- "brown" (See also *bʰébʰrus)	bear (animal) (< OE bera); brown (< OE brūn)	ON bjǫrn "bear (animal)";		phrū́nē "toad"	babhrú "deep brown, reddish brown; tawny"			Lith bė́ras "reddish brown"					

== Positive qualities ==
PIE	English	Gothic	Latin	Ancient Greek	Sanskrit	Iranian	Slavic	Baltic	Celtic	Armenian	Albanian	Tocharian	Hittite
*h₁wésus "good, excellent"		iusiza "better"; (Germanic names, e.g., Wisigoth- "the Visigoths")			vásu "excellent, good; beneficient; goods, property"	Av vohū "good"	OCS veselŭ "merry, joyful, happy"		Gaul Vesu- (in personal names: Vesuavus, Segovesus, Bellovesus)				Luw wāsu- "good"; Pal wašu "well"
*h₁su- "good"				eu- "good, well" (when used prefixally), e.g., eúphoros "well-bearing" (> "euphoria"); eukháristos "good grace"; euángelos "bringing good news"	su- "good" (used prefixally), e.g., suprabhātam "good morning" (See also bhā́s); supraśna- "inquiry as to welfare, lit. good question"	Av hu "good"	OCS sŭ- "good" (used prefixally), e.g., sŭ-čęstĭnŭ "happy, lit. good part"; sŭdravĭje "health", Russ zdoróv'je; sŭrěsti "to meet, encounter"		W hy- "good, well"				
*h₁sónts "being, existing, real, true" (See also *H₁es-)	sooth (< OE sōþ "truth"); soothe (< OE sōþian "to prove the validity of, to confirm as true"); soothsayer (originally "truth-teller") (< PGmc sanþaz + sagjaną "truth + say"); sin (implying "truly guilty") (< OE synn); OE sōþlīċe "truly, really", later "amen"	sunjis "true, truthful, correct"	sōns "guilty, criminal" (compare sin); insōns "innocent"; (Note: Not cognate) sonticus "dangerous, serious, critical"		sát "being, essence, reality" (also used in compounds, e.g., sad·guru); sattvá- "essence, existence, spirit; creature"; satyá- "true, real, genuine; sincere, honest, valid"; satī́ "good, virtuous, faithful wife" (> suttee)						senë/send"thing" gjë "thing" < all from PAlb *sana		
*sweh₂d-, swéh₂dus "sweet"	sweet (< OE swēte)		suāvis "sweet, pleasant, delicious"	hēdús "sweet"	svādú "delicious, tasty, sweet"			Lith. saldus "sweet"					

== Construction, fabrication ==
PIE	English	Gothic	Latin	Ancient Greek	Sanskrit	Iranian	Slavic	Baltic	Celtic	Armenian	Albanian	Tocharian	Hittite
*h₂éyos "copper, bronze"	ore (< OE ār)	aiz "copper"	aes "copper, bronze, brass; money, fee"		áyas "metal, iron"								
*dʰwer- "door, doorway, gate"	door (< OE dor, duru)	daúr, daúrō "door"	forēs (pl.) "door"	tʰurā "door"	dvā́r, dvā́ras (pl.) "door"	Av dvarǝm (acc.) "gate, court"; OPers duvarayā "at the gate" NPers dar "door"	OCS dvĭri "door"	OPrus dwarris "gate, goal", dwars "estate", Lith durys "door", dvaras "manor";Latg durovys "door"	OIr dorus "door" < Proto-Celtic *dworestu-, W dôr "door" < *dʰureH₂	duṙn "door"	derë "door"	B twere "doors"	an-durza "within"
h₂(e)nh₂t- "doorpost"			antae "anteroom"		ā́tā "doorpost"								
*dem- "to build (up), put together"	timber (< OE timber "building material"); teem (< OE temian "to fit"); toft (< OE toft)	timrjan "build, construct, strengthen"		démō "to build, construct, make"									
*domo-, *domu- "house", "home"			domus (domūs) "house"	dómos "house"	dámas "house"	Av dąm, dąmi "in the house"; dǝmā̆na-, nmāna- "house" < *dm-ā̆na-	OCS domŭ "house"	OPrus dimstis "porch", Lith dimstis "entryway", namas "house"	MIr dom-liacc "house of stones"	tun "house"	dhomë "room"	?A tem-, B tam- "be born"	
*gʰerdʰ-, *gʰordʰ-os- "enclosure, fence"	yard (< OE ġeard "enclosure"); garden (< AngNor gardin < Frank *gardo)	gards "yard, court"; ON garðr "fence, enclosed space"	hortus "garden"	kʰórtos "feeding place for animals"	gṛhá "house"	Av gərəδa "daeva cave"	OCS gradŭ "fortification; city"	Latv gãrds; Lith gar̃das "fold, pen"	OIr gort "standing crop", W garth "cliff; enclosure"	OArm gerdastan "the body of servants and captives; estate" (either a borrowing from Iranian or inherited)	gardh "fence, enclosure, barricade"		
*kʷekʷlo- "wheel" (See also *kʷel-)	wheel (< OE hwēol, hweogol < PGerm *hweg(w)ulaz < *kʷekʷlós)	ON hjōl, hvēl "wheel" < PGerm *hweh(w)ulaz < *kʷékʷlos		kúklos "circle", (pl.) "wheels"	cakrá- "wheel"	Av čaxra- "wheel"	OCS kolo "wheel"	OPrus kellin "wheel", Lith kaklas "neck"				A kukäl, B kokale "wagon"	kugullas "donut"
*Hreth₂- "wheel", "wagon"		OHG Rad "wheel"	rota "wheel", "wagon"		rátha "chariot, car"	Av raθa "wagon", "chariot"		Lith rãtai "wagon" (pl.), rãtas "wheel" (sg.)	OIr roth "wheel", "circle", W rhod wheel		rreth "ring, hoop, tyre (for carriages)" (< *Hróth₂ikos)		
*néh₂us "vessel, boat"	OE nōwend "shipmaster, sailor"	ON naust "boathouse"; OIc nōr "ship"	nāvis "ship"	naûs "ship"; Myc na-u-do-mo "shipbuilders"	naú, nāva "ship"	Pers nâv "boat, ship" (archaic)			OIr nó, nau "boat"	OArm naw "ship, boat"			
*h₂wĺ̥h₁neh₂ "wool"	wool (< OE wull)	wulla "wool"	lāna "wool"	lênos "wool, fleece (pl.)", Dor lânos	ū́rṇā "wool, woolen thread"	Av varənā "wool"	OCS vlĭna "wool", OESlav vŭlna "wool"	Latv vil̃na, Lith vìlna "wool", OPrus wilna "skirt (made of wool)"	OIr olann, MBret gloan, glan, OW gulan "wool"	OArm gełmn "fleece, wool"			ḫulanaš "wool"
*s(y)uH- "to sew"	sew (< OE sēowan)	siujan "to sew"	suō (suere) "to sew"; sūtūra "thread, suture"	humḗn "sinew"	sī́vyati "(he) sews", syūtá- "sewn"; sū́tra- "thread, string"		OCS šijǫ (šiti) "to sew"	OPrus šutun "to sew", Lith siūti "to sew", Latg šyut "to sew"					sum(m)anza(n), šuel (?), šuil (?) "thread"
*teks- "to fashion, construct"	OE þeox "spear"	OHG dehsa, dehsala "hatchet"	texō (texere) "to weave"	téktōn "carpenter", tíktō "I give birth"	takṣati, tā́ṣṭi "(he) fashions"	Av tašaiti "(he) cuts out, manufactures"; OPers us-tašanā "stairway" < "*construction"; MPers tāšīδan "to do carpentry"	OCS tešǫ (tesati) "to hew",	OPrus tesatun "to hew", Lith tašyti "to hew"	OIr tāl "axe" < *tōkslo-		teshë "cloth, robe"		takkeszi "puts together"
*webʰ- "to weave"	weave (< OE wefan), web (<P.Gmc. *wabjan)	OHG weban "to weave"; ON vefa		hupʰaínō "I weave"	ubhnā́ti "ties together"; ūṛna-vābhi- "spider" (litt. "wool-weaver")	Av ubdaēna- "made of cloth"; NPers bāfad "(he) weaves"			W gweu "knit, weave"		venj "I weave" < *webʰnyō	A wpantär (them. pres.), B wāp- "to weave"	wēpta- "wove"
*werǵ- "to work"	work (< OE weorc, wyrc̣an)	waúrkjan "to work"	urgeō (urgēre) "to push, drive"	(w)érgon "work", érdō, hrézdō "I work" < *wérĝ-yoH₂, *wréĝ-yoH₂	varcas "activity" (? not in Pokorny)	Av varəza- "work, activity", vərəzyeiti "(he) works"; NPers varz, barz "field work, husbandry"	vrǔšiti "to act, to do"	OPrus wargs "bad, evil, malicious, vicious", wargtwei "to torment oneself, to suffer", Lith vargas "misery", vargti "to suffer"	MW gwreith "deed" < *wreĝ-tu-	gorc "work "	rregj "to clean"	A wärk-, B wārk- "to shear"	
*wes- "to clothe, wear clothes"	wear (< OE werian)	wasjan "to clothe"	vestis "clothing"	héstai "gets dressed"	váste "(s/he) gets dressed"; vástra- "clothing"	Av vaste, vaŋhaiti "(he) gets dressed"		OPrus westi "corset"	W gwisg "clothing"	z-genum "I put on (clothes)" < *wes-nu-	vesh "dress" veshje "clothing"	B wastsi, wästsi "clothing"	wassezzi "(he) clothes"

== Self-motion, rest ==
PIE	English	Gothic	Latin	Ancient Greek	Sanskrit	Iranian	Slavic	Baltic	Celtic	Armenian	Albanian	Tocharian	Hittite
*h₁es- "to be", *h₁es-ti "is", *h₁és-mi "am" Cf. Indo-European copula (See also *h₁sónts)	is (< OE is), am	ist "is"	sum (esse) "I am (to be)"; est "it is"	estí "is,"; Dorian Greek entí "(they) are" <- *h₁s-enti	ásti "is"; ásmi "am"	Av asti "is"; Persian ast "is"	OCS jestŭ "is"	OPrus ast "is", ēst "almost", Lith esti "is"	OIr is "is"; OW hint "(they) are" <- *h₁s-enti; W sydd "(which) is"	em "I am"	është "is"	B ste "is"	ēszi "is"
*bʰuh₂- "to become" Cf. Indo-European copula	be (< OE bēon); OE būan "to dwell"	bauan "to dwell"	fuī "I was"	pʰúomai "I become", épʰū "became"	bʰávati "become, is", ábʰūt "became, was"	Av bavaiti, OPers bavatiy "(he) becomes"	OCS byti "to become, be"	OPrus butwei "to be", Lith būti "to be"	Gaul biiete "be! (imperative)"; (Note: ibetis uciu andecari biiete - 'drink from here and be nice' - Limé (Aisne) inscription); OIr buith "being", W bod "to be"	busanim "sprout up"	buj, bûj "I dwell, stay overnight" < *bunjō		
*sed-, *si-sd- "to sit"	sit (< OE sittan < *sed-yo-nom)	sitan "to sit"	sedeō (sedēre) "to sit", sīdō "I sit down" < *si-sd-oH₂	hézdomai "I sit" < *sed-yo-, hizdō "I set" < *si-sd-oH₂	sátsi "(he) sits", aor. ásadat "sat"; sī́dati "(he) sits" < *si-sd-eti; Upaniṣad lit. "sit-down-beside" < upa: 'by, beside', ni: 'down', sad: 'sit'	Av ni-šaŋhasti "(he) sits down", opt. hazdyā-t "(he) should sit", hiδaiti "(he) sits" < *si-sd-eti; OPers caus. niya-šād-ayam "I set"	OCS sěždǫ (sěděti) "to sit"	OPrus sistwei "to sit down", Lith sedėti "to be sitting", sėsti "to sit"	OIr sa(i)did "sits"; Br hezañ "to stop"; W eistedd "to sit"	nstim "I sit" (< *ni-zdyō), hecanim (< *sed-s-an-yō) "I sit on, I ride"	shëtis "to walk"		
*legʰ- "to lie down"	lie (< OE lic̣gan)	ligan "to lie down"	lectus "bed"	lékʰomai "I lie down"	laṅghate "(he) leans, lies down"	NPers ley "lie down"	OCS ležǫ (ležati) "to lie down"	OPrus laztwei "to lie down"	OIr laigid "lies down"		lagje "city quarter"	A läk- "to lie", B lyśalyñe "(act of) lying down"	lagari "(he) lies down"
*ḱey- "to lie down; settle, bed, cozy, familiar"	home (< OE hām "village, home" < *k̂oi-mos); hewe "domestic, servant" (< OE hīwa "family member")	háims (háimáis) "village, town" < *k̂oi-mis; heiwafrauja "marriage"	cīvis "city dweller, citizen" < *k̂ei-wis ⇒ (Note: civic, city, citizen, etc.); cūnae "cradle; nest"; Cūnīna (Roman goddess who protects infants in the cradle) cieō; "I put in motion; act, move, stir; rouse" ⇒ (Note: cite, incite, excite, Incitātus (Caligula's horse), resuscitate, solicit, etc.)	keîmai "I lie (idle, sick, dead, etc.)"; kíō "I go" (Homeric); kīnéō "I move, set in motion, remove; inflect (grammar); meddle; stir on" (> kinetic, cinema, etc.); koítē "bed, place of rest; lair; lodging"; koitā́zō "I put to bed, cause to rest"	śētē (older śáyē) "(he) lies", śērē "they lie"; śayú "orphan"; śéva- "dear, precious"; śivá- "favorable, happy, fortunate; auspicious" (later applied to the god Rudra, first as Śiva-rudra, then simply Śiva; also spelled Shiva)	Av saēte "(he) lies", sōire "they lie"	OCS sěmija "family"; sěmĭ "household member"	OPrus seimi "family", kaims "village", Lith šeima "family", kaimas "village" (via Germanic); Latv sieva "wife"	OIr cóim, cóem, OW cum "dear"	sirem "I love" < *k̂eiro-	komb "nation, people"		kitta, kittari "lies"; Luwian ziyari "lies"
*tḱey- "to settle, live; cultivate"			sinō "I let, permit, allow; set down"; situs "permitted, allowed; laid, set down; placed" ⇒ (Note: site, situation, etc.); dēsinō "I leave off, cease, desist" (> desinence); pōnō < po + sinō "I place, put, lay; set up" ⇒ (Note: expose, exponent, depose, deponent, oppose, opponent, proponent, posit, position, positive, post, etc.)	ktízō "I found, build, establish; populate; produce"; eüktímenos "well-built, nice place"; ktísis "a founding, settling; creature"; ktílos "tame, docile, obidient"; ktísma "colony, foundation"	kṣéti "(s/he) abides, stays, dwells; remains"; kṣití "abode, habitation, dwelling; the earth"								
*steh₂- "to stand (i.e. be standing)"	stand (< OE standan)	standan "to stand"; OHG stān, stēn "to stand"	stō (stāre) "to stand", sistō (sistere) "to cause to stand"	Doric hístāmi "I stand"	sthā- / tíṣṭhati "(he) stands"	Av hištaiti "(he) stands"; OPers impf. a-ištata "(he) stood"	OCS stajǫ (stati) "to stand up"	OPrus stalitwei "to stand", Lith stoti "to stand, to stop"	OIr tair-(ṡ)issiur "I stand"; W sefyll "to stand"	stanam "I build; gain"	mbështet, pshtet "I support"	B stäm- "to stand", ste "is", "stare" "(they) are"	istanta- "to stay, delay"
*h₁ey- "to go"	yede (< OE ēode "went")	iddja "went"	eō (īre) "to go"	eĩmi "I (will) go"	éti "(he) goes", yánti "(they) go"	Av aēiti "(he) goes", yeinti "(they) go"; OPers aitiy "goes"	OCS jiditi "to move away, to arrive", jidene "coming"	OPrus eitwei "to go", Lith eiti "to go by walking"	W wyf "I am"; OIr ethaid "goes" < *it-āt-	iǰanem (aorist ēǰ) "I climb down" < *i-gh-	iki "to leave; flee" *H₁(e)i-K-	A yā "he went", B yatsi "to go" < *yā-	īt "go!"
*gʷem- "to come"	come (< OE cuman)	qiman "to come"; OSax cuman [an liudi] "to come (to people) [to be born]"	veniō (venīre) "to come" (Note: See also Umbrian benust (Latin uenerit) and Oscan kúm-bened (Latin conuentio).)	baínō "I go"	gámati "(he) goes", aor. ágan, gan "(he) went"	Av ǰamaiti "goes"; OAv inj. uz-ǰǝ̄n "(he) goes", pl. g^{ǝ}mǝn "they go"		OPrus gimtwei "to be born", Lith gimti "to be born", Latv dzimt "to bear (a son)"		ekn (< *h₁e-gʷem-t) "(he) came"		A käm-, kum-, B käm-, kam-, śem "to come"	Luw zammantis "newborn child" (?)
*Hyewdʰ- "to move swiftly, to move upright, to rise (as if to fight)"			iubeō "I authorize, legitimate; bid, command, order"; iussus "order, command, decree, ordinance"	euthús "straight, direct"; eîthar "at once, immediately, forthwith"; husmī́nē "battle, conflict, combat"	yúdhyate "to fight, battle; wage war"; yodháyati "to engage in battle; to overcome in war, to be a match for; to lead to war, to cause to fight"; yuddhá- "battle, fight, war"; yoddhṛ "fighter, warrior, soldier"; yudhmá- "hero, warrior"		OCS oiminŭ "warrior"; Pol judzić "to incite, instigate"	Lith judėti "to move"					
*peth₂- "to spread out; fly (spread wings)" (See also *péth₂r̥)	fathom (< OE fæþm)		petō "I ask, beg, request; aim; attack, thrust at"; pateō "I am open; accessible, attainable; increase, extend" (> patent); pandō "I spread, open out, extend; unfold, expand" (> expand); passus < *pat-s-tus "spread out; step, pace" (> pass); impetus "attack, assault; rapid motion"; petulāns "impudent, wanton; petulant" > petulant; patera "broad flat dish, saucer"; propitius "favorable, well-disposed" (> propitious)	pétomai "I fly; rush, dart; make haste"; pī́ptō "I fall, throw self down"; petánnūmi "I spread out, open"; ptôma "fall; misfortune, calamity; ruin" (> symptom); ptôsis "falling; (grammar) case, inflection"; ptōtikós "capable of inflexion"; pétalon "leaf (plant, flower or tree)" > petal	pátati "(s/he) flies; descends, falls"; pātáyati "(s/he) causes to fly, throws; causes to fall; pours, spills"								
*ped- "to walk, step; stumble, fall" (See also *pōds)	fetter (< OE feter); OE fæt "step; stride; pace, gait		impediō "I hinder, impede, obstruct" (> impede); expediō "I unfetter; remove impediments; prepare" (> expedite); pecco < *ped-co "I sin, transgress; offend" ⇒ (Note: impeccable, impeach); pedica "fetter, shackle; snare"; pessum < *ped·tum "to the lowest part; to the bottom; in ruin"; pessimus "worst, lowest" (> pessimism); peior "worse" (> pejorative); oppidum "town" (step > ground > town)	pédon "ground, earth"; pedíon "open country, plain, field; female genitals"; pēdón "oar blade, oar"; pēdálion "steering paddle"; pezós < *peďďós "on foot, walking; on land, infantry"; pódion "base" ⇒ (Note: podium, pew)	pádyate "(s/he) moves, goes; falls"; pādáyati "(s/he) causes to fall, drops"; pada- "step, stride, pace; footstep, vestige; plot of ground; a fourth"		padati, pasti "to fall"; pěšĭ "on foot, pedestrian"; padežĭ "fall; downfall, disaster"; pod "ground, floor"	Lith pėda "foot"					
*sekʷ- "to follow"	OE sec̣g "follower, companion, man"	ON seggr "hero"	sequor (sequī) "to follow" ⇒ (Note: sequence, second, segue, etc.)	hépomai "I follow"	sácate "(he) follows"	Av hačaitē, hačaiti "(he) follows"	šagati "to walk, stride, step"; Russ šag "step"	OPrus sektwei "to shallow [To breathe lightly]", Lith sekti "to follow"	OIr sechithir "follows"		shoh " I see"		
*steygʰ- "to go, climb, march"	stair (< OE stǣġer); sty (< OE stīgan); stile (< OE stiġel, stigol)	steigan "climb" Ger steigen "to ascend, climb, rise"	vestīgō "I follow a track, search" (> investigate); vestīgium "footprint, track; trace, mark; sole of foot" (> "vestige")	stíkhos "a row (of soldiers); a line of poetry" > Russ stix "verse, a line of poetry; poem (plu)"; stoîkhos "row, course, file"; stoikheîon "one of a row, one of a series; element" > stoichio- (> stoichiometry, etc.); stókhos "pillar of brick; target"	stighnóti "(s/he) steps, steps up, mounts"		OCS stignǫti "to attain; reach"; stĭza "path"				? Shteg "path"		
*wert- "to turn, rotate"	-ward (< OE -weard "facing, turned toward"); worth (obsolete meaning "to become", compare German werden) (< OE weorþ); weird (< OE wyrd, wurd "fate, destiny"); OE weorþung "an evaluation, appreciation"	wairþan "become, happen" Ger werden "to become, to get; to turn; to be, happen"; Wurst "sausage, wurst" (< PGmc "something twisted")	vertō "I turn, revolve; turn around, reverse, retreat" ⇒ (Note: vert-, verse, versus, version, invert, convert, inverse, reverse, controversy, anniversary etc.); vertex, vortex "whirlpool"; vertīgō "giddiness"; prōsus, prorsus < proversus "forwards, towards" > prose; (Note: Now compare 'prose' and 'verse') re- < PIE *wret-, metathesis of *wert- "re-" (> re- (again, repetition, etc.))		vartate "(it) turns, rotates; moves, advances; occurs"; vartana- "a turning; conduct, behavior, intercourse"; vartayáti "(it) turns" (transitive, causative); vártman "track; way, course, path"		OCS vrĭtěti "to turn"; vrotiti "to return"; vrěteno "spindle"; vrota "gate, door"; vratŭ "turn, rotor, wheel"; vrěmę < *vertmen "hour; time" (Compare Skt vártman)	Lith versti "to turn", vartai "gate"			rris "to grow, to increase"		
*bʰegʷ- "to run, flee"				phobéō "I put to flight, terrify, alarm; threaten"; phóbos "fear, terror; fright, panic; flight, retreat"	bhājáyati "(s/he) causes to flee"	Kurd bazdan "to run, to escape"	OCS běgati, běžati "to flee, run, escape";	Lith bėgti "to run"					
*bʰewg- "to flee"			fugiō "I flee"; fuga "flight, escape"	pheúgō "I flee"; phugḗ "flight, escape"				Lith baugus "scary", baugštus "scared easily"					

== Object motion ==
PIE	English	Gothic	Latin	Ancient Greek	Sanskrit	Iranian	Slavic	Baltic	Celtic	Armenian	Albanian	Tocharian	Hittite
*bʰer- "to carry"	bear (< OE beran); burden, burthen (< OE byrþen)	baíran "to carry"	ferō (ferre) "to carry"; lucifer "light-bearing, light-bringing"	pʰerō "I carry"; khristóphoros "Christ-bearing"	bʰarati "(he) carries"	Av baraiti "(he) carries"; OPers barantiy "they carry"; NPers bordan "to carry"; Kurd birin "to carry, to take"	OCS berǫ (bĭrati) "to carry"	Lith berti "to pour non liquid"	OIr biru "I carry"; W beru "to flow"	berem "I carry"	bie "I carry"; barrë "load, burden"		
*weǵʰ- "to convey"	weigh (< OE wegan "carry"); way (< OE weġ); wain "wagon" (< OE wæġn) (Note: wagon is a loan-word from Dutch.)	ga-wigan "to move, shake"	vehō (vehere) "to convey"	Pamphylian wekʰétō "he should bring"; Cypriot éwekse "brought there"	váhati "(he) drives"; vahana- (< vah) "divine mount or vehicle of Hindu deities" (lit. "a carrying")	Av vazaiti "(he) leads, carries"	OCS vezǫ (vesti) "to drive"	OPrus weztun "to ride", Lith vežti "to drive"	OIr fēn, W gwain (type of wagon) < *weǵʰ-no-; W arwain "to lead"		vjedh "I steal"		Hier Luw wa-zi/a- "drive"
*yew-, *yewg- "to join, yoke, tie together" (See also yugóm)		juk "yoke" ON eykr draft animal; ON eyki vehicle, cart	iungō "I yoke, join" ⇒ (Note: join, joinder, joint, junction, juncture, conjugal, conjugate, conjunct, adjunct, injunction, rejoin, rejoinder, jostle, joust, adjust, etc.); iūxtā "nearly; near, close to"; coniunx, coniux "spouse, partner (husband or wife)"	zeúgnūmi "I yoke, saddle; join, link together"; zeûgma "band, bond, that which is used for joining; bridge of boats"; zeûgos "pair, two things, persons or animals seen as a pair"	yunákti "(s/he) yokes, harnesses, joins"; yóga- "yoking, act of joining; yoke, team, vehicle; employment, use, performance; remedy, cure; means, device, way, manner, method; trick, fraud; undertaking; connection, relation; fitness, suitability; application, concentration, union, yoga"; yóktra- "fastening or tying instrument; rope, thong, halter"; yugmá- "pair, couple; Gemini (zodiac sign); junction, confluence"; yújya- "union, alliance"; yugya- "a vehicle, chariot; draft animal"; yuj (root noun) "a yoke-fellow, companion, associate; pair, couple; the Aśvins"			Lith jungiu "I join"					
*h₂eǵ- "to lead, drive"		ON aka "to drive"	agō (agere) "to drive, do"	ágō "I lead"	ájati "(he) drives"	Av azaiti "(he) drives"; Kurd ajotin "to drive"	ehati "to drive"		OIr ad-aig "compels"; OW agit, hegit "goes"	acem "I lead"		A ak-, B āk- "go, lead"	
*h₂eḱs- "axis, axle" < *h₂eǵ-	OE eax		axis "axle"		ákṣa- "axle"		Russian osь "axis, axle"	Lith ašis "axle, axis"	W echel "axle, axis"		ashkë "wood splinter <PAlb a(k)škā "axis"		
*dʰeh₁-, dʰh₁- "to place, put"	do (< OE dōn)	deds "deed"	faciō (facere) "to do" < *dʰh₁-k-yoh₂; con-ditus "built" (orig. "put together"), ab-ditus "removed" (orig. "put away") < Proto-Italic *-θatos < *dʰh₁-tos	títʰēmi "I put" < *dʰí-dʰeh₁-mi	dádʰāti "(he) puts" < *dʰé-dʰeh₁-ti	Av daδāiti "(he) puts"; OPers impf. adadā "(he) established"	OCS děti "to lay"	OPrus ditun "to put", Lith dėti "to put"	Gaulish dede "he put (pt.)"; W dodi "to place, to put";OIr -tarti "he gives" < Proto-Celtic *to-ro-ad-dīt < *-dʰeh₁-t	dnel "to put"; ed "he put (past)"	dhatë "place, location" < *dʰh₁-teh₂	A tā-, täs-, tas-, B tes- "to lay" < *dʰeh₁-s-	dāi "puts"
*stel- "to put, place, locate; be set, firm"	stall (< OE steall); stell (non-standard) "to place, set up" (< OE stellan)	Ger stellen "to put, place, position"	locus < *stlocus "place, spot, location" ⇒ (Note: local, locate, locality, locomotion, allocate, etc.); stultus, stolidus "foolish, stupid"; stolō "shoot, branch" > stolon (botany); stolus < AG stólos "navigation; fleet equipment"	stéllō "I send; make ready, prepare; summon"; stólos "expedition; army, fleet"; apóstolos "one sent forth; messenger, envoy" > apostle; epistolḗ < epistéllō "message, letter; commission; will" ⇒ (Note: epistle, pistle, epistolary, etc.); stḗlē "block of stone, buttress; boundary post" > stele, stela	sthala- "place, ground, location"		OCS stĭlati "to spread"				shtjell "loosen, I wind up"		
*deH₃-, dʰH̥₃- "to give"			dō (dare) "to give"; dator "giver, donor"; dōnum "gift"	dídōmi "I give"	dádāti "(he) gives"; dātṛ "giver, donor"; dānam "gift, giving"	Av dadāiti "(he) gives"; OPers impv. dadātuv "let him give"; NPers dãdan "to give"	OCS damĭ "I will give"	OPrus datun "to give", Lith duoti "to give"	OIr dān, W dawn "gift"	tam "I give"	dhashë "I gave" < *dH̥₃-sm̥		dāi "takes"
*kap- "to grab"	have (< OE habban), heave (< OE hebban); haven "hæfen"	haban "to have", hafjan "to lift"	capiō (capere) "to take"	káptō "I snatch, swallow"; kaûkos "cup" > Lat caucus	kapaṭī "two handfuls"	NPers časpīdan, čapsīdan, cafsīdan "to grasp, seize"	Ukrainian khapaty "to grab"	OPrus kaps "grave", Lith kapas "grave", kapt "expression to indicate grabbing.	OIr cacht "female slave", W caeth "slave, captive" < *kap-tos "taken"		kap "I grasp, grab", kam "I have"		
*gʰabʰ- "to seize, take"	give (< OE ġiefan)	giban "to give"	habeō (habēre) "to have"		gábʰastis "forearm, hand"	OPers grab "to seize"; Kurd girtin "to take, to seize"	Russ. xvatát "to snatch, suffice"	OPrus gabtun "to catch", Lith gebėti "to be able to"	OIr gaibid "takes"; W gafael "to take hold, to grip"				
*gʷʰen- "to strike, kill"	bane (< OE bana "murderer")	banja "blow, wound, ulcer"	dē-fendō (dēfendere) "to ward off, defend", of-fendō (offendere) "to bump, offend"	tʰeínō "I kill" < *gʷʰen-yoH₂, épepʰnon "I killed" < redup. + *gʷʰn-om	hánti "(he) strikes, kills" < *gʷʰen-ti, gʰnánti "they strike, kill"; vṛtra·han "Vṛtra-killer, a name of Indra"	Av ǰainti "(he) strikes, kills", ni-γne (mid.) "I strike down"; OPers impf. ajanam "I struck down"	OCS ženǫ (gŭnati) "drive (animals to pasture)", žĭnjǫ (žęti) "reap"	OPrus gintun "to defend", Lith ginti " to defend", ganyti "to drive animals to pasture"	OIr gonim "I wound, kill"; W gwanu "to stab"	ǰnem "I strike" < *gʷʰen-oH₂, ǰnǰem "I destroy" < *gʷʰen-yoH₂	gjanj "I hunt" < *gʷʰen-yoH₂	B käsk- "to scatter to destruction" < *gʷʰn̥-sk-	kuēnzi "kills" < *gʷʰen-ti
*bʰeyd- "to split, cleave"	bit (< OE bite);bite (< OE bitan); bait (< ON beita)	beitan "bite"	'findō "I split"; fissus < fid·tus "split"; fissiō "splitting, fission"		bhid-, bhinátti "(s/he) splits, breaks"; bhedati "(s/he) splits"; bhinná < bhid·ná "split, cloven"								
*der- "to tear, crack; split, separate"	tear (< OE teran); turd (< OE tord)	*taurþs "destruction, a teardown"		dérō "to skin, flay"; dérma "skin, hide"	dṛṇā́ti "(s/he) tears, rends, rips; splits open, bursts"		OCS dĭrati "to tear, flay"	Lith dirti "to skin"			djerr "I destroy <PIE *dr̥-néH-ti		
*bʰreg- "to break"	break (< OE brecan); breech, breeches (< OE brēċ)	brikan "break, wreck, compete"	frango "I break, shatter"; frāctus "broken"; fragilis "breakable"										
*sek- "to cut off, sever" (Note: Some of these words might instead derive from *sekʷ- "to follow")	saw (tool) (< OE sagu); sax "slate hammer" (< OE seax); seax (directly borrowed from OE seax); zax (< OE seax); Saxon (< Proto-Germanic *sahsą "rock, knife")		secō, sectum "I cut, cut off; cleave; castrate; wound; hurt" ⇒ (Note: sect (or possibly from Lat. sequi, "follow"), -sect, sectile, section, sector, dissect, insect, intersect, resect, transect, etc.); segmen, segmentum "piece; a cutting, cut; slice; segment"; signum "sign, mark, signal; seal, signet; emblem, etc"; sexus "division; sex; gender"; saxum "stone, rock"				OCS sěšti "to cut, to mow" Pol siekać "to cut"				shat/shatë "mattock, hoe" <PIE *sēk-teh₂-		
*(s)ker- "to cut" (See also: *sek-)	shear (< OE scieran); share (< OE sċearu); shard, sherd (< OE sċeard ); shred (< OE sċrēad); scrap (< ON skrapa); scrape (< ON skrapa); short (< OE sċort); screen < PGmc *skirmiz "fur, hide" Yid shirem "umbrella"; Italian schermo "screen"; Russ šírma "screen, shield"; shirt (< OE sċyrte); skirt (< ON skyrta); scar (< PGmc *skardaz "gap, cut"); score (< OE scoru)		curtus "short; broken"; corium "skin, hide, leather"; carō, carnis "flesh, meat, pulp" ⇒ (Note: carnal, carnage, carnation, carnival, carrion, caruncle, carnivorous, charnel, charcuterie, incarnate, etc., Spa carne); cēna "dinner, supper ('portion')"; cortex "bark of a tree, cork" cork; scortum "a skin, hide; harlot"; scrotum; scrautum "a quiver made of hide"; scrūta "rubbish, broken trash" > Lat scrūtor "I search, examine thoroughly" ⇒ (Note: scrutiny, scrutinize, inscrutable, etc.); scrūpus "a rough sharp stone; anxiety, uneasiness"; scrūpulus "a small sharp or pointed stone; anxiety, uneasiness, doubt" ⇒ (Note: scruple, scrupulous, etc.)	keírō "I shear, shave, cut hair; ravage; destroy; cut short, lessen"; kormós "trunk of a tree; log of timber"; kérma "fragment; coin; cash"	kartati, kṛṇátti, kṛntáte "(s/he) cuts"; cárman "skin; hide, pelt"; kṛtí "knife, dagger"		OCS skora "bast, skin"; kora "bark"; OCS xrabrŭ "brave"	Lith skersti "to slaughter, to cut (especially animal's neck)", kirsti "to chop", kirpti "to cut", skirti "to separate", skirtingas "different", kirvis "axe"	W ysgaru "to separate, to divorce"		shqerr "to tear, scratch" <PAlb *skera		
*skey- *skeyd- "to split, dissect, divide" (See also: *sek-, *(s)ker-)	shed (< OE sċēadan); sheath, sheathe (< OE sċēaþ); shide "a piece of wood, firewood" (< OE sċīd); shite, shit (< OE sċītan)		sciō "I can, know, understand, have knowledge" > science; scindō, scissus "I cut, tear, rend; tear off; destroy"	skhízō "I split, cleave" > schizophrenia; skhísma "split, divided; division" > schism; skhísis "cleaving, parting, division; vulva"	chítti "split, division"; √chid-, chinatti "(s/he) splits, cuts off, divides"		OCS cěditi "to strain, filter"; čistiti "to clean, purify"; štedrŭ "generous"; štitŭ "shield"	Lith skiesti "to dilute", skaidyti "to divide into pieces"			shqisë "sense"		
*h₃er- "to move, to stir; to rise, spring; quarrel, fight"			orior "I rise, get up"; oriēns "rising" > orient; origo "act, event or process of coming into existence; source" > origin	órnūmi "I set upon, awaken, raise, excite, stir up"; oûros "fair wind"; éris "strife, quarrel; rivalry"	ṛṇoti "to attack, rise"; ṛtí "quarrel, strife; attack"		OCS ratĭ "war, battle"						
*h₃reyH- "to move, set in motion; flow, stream (of water); pour, rain; churn"	ride (< OE rīdan); raid (< OE rād); run (< OE iernan); -rith "small stream (found in surnames and placenames)"(< OE rīþ)		rīvus "stream" > rival (lit. "using the same stream as another"), derive; irrīto "to irritate"		riṇā́ti "to make flow, release"; rītí "motion, course; current; custom, rite"; rétas "flow, gush, current, stream; seed, sperm"		OCS rinǫti "to push, shove"		Gau rēda "chariot"; Gau rēnos "river, waterway" > Lat Rhēnus > Rhine		re "clouds" <PAlb *rina		
*selǵ- "to let go, send, release"	sulk (< OE āsolcen < āseolcan "to be slow; weak, slothful")				sṛjáti "(it) lets go, discharges, emits"; sarjáyati "causes to let loose, creates"; sṛṣṭá- "let go, discharged, abandoned"; sṛ́ṣṭi "letting go, emission; production, procreation; creation, creation of the world"; sárga- "pouring, rush"; sṛká- "arrow, spear"								
*kʷel-, kʷelh₁- "to turn" (See also *kʷekʷlo-)	halse "neck, throat" (< OE heals)	hals "neck"	colō "I till, cultivate (land); inhabit"; cultus "tilled, cultivated" ⇒ (Note: cult, culture, cultivate, incult, etc.); colōnus "farmer; colonist, inhabitant"; -cola "inhabitant; tiller, cultivator; worshipper"; colōnia "colony, settlement; possession" ⇒ (Note: colony, colonial, etc.); collum "neck, throat (one that turns)" ⇒ (Note: collar, accolade, decollate, etc); inquilīnus "sojourner, tenant, lodger" (Note: Not related to Spanish alquilar)	pélō "in motion, go; become"; pólos "pivot, hinge; axis, pole star" > pole; pálin "back, backwards; again, once more" ⇒ (Note: palindrome, palimpsest, palinode); télos "completion, maturity; fulfilment; result, product" > teleology, etc.; Aristotélēs "excellent perfection"; teléō "bring about, complete, fulfill; perform, accomplish"; têle "far off, far away" ⇒ (Note: telegraph, television, etc.); pálai "long ago"; palaiós "old, aged; ancient" > paleolithic, etc.	cárati "it moves, walks, stirs; travels"; caraṇa-, calana- "motion; action; behavior, conduct"		OCS kologŭ "Yule (lit. turn)"; kolovrotŭ "circulation, whirlpool; wheel and axle"; Bul kolovóz "rut, wheel track"; koláč "a type of (round) bread"				sjell "to turn, to bring" <PAlb *tšela		
*welH-, *wel- "to turn, to wind, roll"	wallow (< OE wielwan); well (up) (gush) (< OE wellan, willan); well (water source, where the water 'wells up') (< OE wielle); wall (to boil, spring) (< OE weallan); walk (< OE wealcan); wale (< OE walu "ridge, bank")	walwjan "to roll"; Ger Walz (< walzen "to dance") "the waltz"; Welle "wave"	volvō "I roll, tumble" ⇒ (Note: evolve, revolve, involve, involucrum, convolve, devolve, voluble etc.;) volūmen "roll, scroll, book; turn; fold" > volume; vallis "valley; hollow" ⇒ (Note: vale, valley); vallum "wall, rampart"; intervallum "space between walls" > interval; volūcra "a worm, caterpillar"; valgus "knock-kneed, unstraight"; valva "folding door" > valve; vulva "womb"	eilúō "I wrap, enfold; crawl"; hélix "anything twisted" ⇒ (Note: helix, helical, helicopter); hólmos "round, smooth stone; cylindrical bow, dial"	valati, valate "(it) turns, turns to; moves to; covers"; úlba- "cover, envelope; womb, vulva"; valayá- "coil"; ūrmí "wave"		OCS vlĭna "wave"; vlŭnenije "undulation, swell; turmoil, agitation"; Russ valítʹ "to knock down, kill; cut, fell"; val "roller, billow; rampart; shaft"	Lith vilnìs "wave"		OldArm geł "snake, dragon"			
*weyp- or *weyb- "to shake, tremble, agitate; sway, swing; turn, wind"	wipe (< OE wīpian); whip (< OE wippen); weave ("to wander") (< ON veifa "wave, flag"); OE wifer "arrow, missile; sword"; swivel (< OE swifan + el); waive < waif ("ownerless, homeless") (< ON veif); (Note: Probably) gimp (< OF wimpil "head scarf"); gimlet (< AF wimble "drill")>	biwaibjan "to wind around, wrap"; faurwaipjan "to bind, muzzle"	vibrō "I shake, agitate; tremble; glimmer" > veer, vibrate, etc.		vip-, vépate "it trembles, shakes, shivers, vibrates, quivers"; viprá- "excited, stirred; inspired"			Lith viẽpti "to make a face, gape"; vaipýtis "to grimace, bend"; výburti "to swing, turn around"					
*leykʷ-, *li-ne-kʷ- "to leave behind"	OE lēon "to lend"	leiƕan "to lend"	linquō (linquere) "to leave behind"	leípō, limpánō "I leave behind"	riṇákti "(he) leaves behind", 3rd. pl. riñcanti "they leave behind"	Av -irinaxti "(he) frees"; NPers rēxtan "to pour out"	OBulg otŭ-lěkŭ "something left over", lišiti "to rob" < *leikʷ-s-, Ukr lyshyty "to leave behind"	Lith likti "to stay"	OIr lēicid "(he) leaves behind, releases"	lkʿanem "I leave behind"	Alb Lej leave		
*Hrewk- "to dig, till (soil)"; *HrewH- "to dig, to root" (See also *Hrew-, *Hrewp-)	rock (as in 'to move, sway') (< OE roccian); rag (< ON rǫggr)		runcō "I weed, clear of weeds, weed out"; ruō "I dig out"; rutrum "shovel"		luñcati "(s/he) plucks, pulls out, tears off; peels"		OCS ryti "to dig"; OCS rylo "spade, snouts"						
*Hrewp- "to break, tear up" (See also *Hrew-, *Hrewk-)	reave, reeve, reve, bereave (< OE (be)rēofan)		rumpō "I break, burst, tear, rend; split" > rout, ruption, abrupt, etc.		rópa- "disturbing, confusing; fissure"; lopa- "breaking, injury, destruction"								
*h₁reh₁- "to row"	rudder (< OE rōþor)		rēmus "oar"	erétēs "(in the plural) oars"	áritra- "propelling, driving"				W rhwyf "spade, shovel"				

== Time ==
PIE	English	Gothic	Latin	Ancient Greek	Sanskrit	Iranian	Slavic	Baltic	Celtic	Armenian	Albanian	Tocharian	Hittite
*nu- "now"	now, Scot noo (< OE nū)	nu "now"	num, nunc (num + -ce) "now"; nūper "lately, recently"	nûn, nun, nu "now"	nú "now, so now, now then; at once"; nū́ "now"; nūtane "current, present"	Avestan nū "now"	OCS nyně "now"; nŭ "but"	Lith nū, nù "now"; nū̃n "now, today"; nūnaĩ "now, today, nowadays"			nu "when"; ni "now";		nu "now, and"
*dʰǵʰyés "yesterday"	yesterday (< OE ġeostra)	gistra- "tomorrow (?)"	heri "yesterday"	kʰtʰés "yesterday"	hyás "yesterday" < *ǵʰyés	Av zyō, OPers diya(ka) "yesterday"			OIr in-dē, W ddoe "yesterday"		dje "yesterday"		
*nokʷts (nekʷts) "night"	night (< OE neaht, niht < *nokʷtis)	nahts (nahts) "night" < *nokʷts	nox (noctis) "night"	núks (núktos) "night"	nák (instr. pl. náktīs) "night"	Av naxtu "night", Kurd nixte "rainy, cloudy (lack of sunlight)"	OCS noštĭ "night"	OPrus nakts "night", Lith naktis "night"	OIr i-nnocht, W heno "tonight"		natë "night"	A n[a]ktim "nightly", B nekciye "in the evening"	nekuz (gen. sg.) "of evening", nekuzzi "it becomes dark"
*kʷséps "night"					kṣap "night, darkness"	Av xṣ̌ap "night"							
*wek(ʷ)speros "evening"	west (< OE west)		vesper "evening"	hésperos "of the evening; western" (Note: See also Hesperus "evening star"; Hesperides "daughters of the evening; nymphs of the west".)			OCS večerŭ "evening"; Rus Zorya Vechernyaya "deity of the evening star"	Latv vakars, Lith vãkaras "evening"; Vakarine "goddess of the evening star"	OIr ucher "evening"	OArm gišer "night; darkness"			
*h₂éwsōs "dawn", *h₂ews-tero- "east", *h₂ewso- "gold"	eastern (< OE ēasterne)	ON austr "east"	aurōra "dawn" (< *ausōsa, by rhot), aurum "gold" (< *ausom)	Doric āṓs "dawn"; Aeolic aúōs, ā́wōs "dawn"	uṣās (uṣásas), acc. uṣā́sam "dawn"	Av ušā̊ (ušaŋhō), acc. ušā̊ŋhǝm "dawn"	OCS (j)utro "morning"	OPrus austra "dawn", auss "gold"; Lith aušra "dawn", auksas "gold"; Latv ausma, ausmina "dawn"	OIr fāir "sunrise", W gwawr "dawn" < *wōsri-	?os-ki "gold"		?A wäs "gold"	
*ken- "to arise, begin"	begin (< OE beginnan)	duginnan "to begin"	recēns "new, fresh, young" > recent	kainós "new, recent; fresh, unused; unusual" > Cenozoic	kanyā̀, kaníyā "maiden, virgin; daughter"; kanī́na- "young, youthful"		OCS načęti "to begin"; konŭ "beginning, end"; konĭcĭ "end"; zakonŭ "law"; štenę "young animal"						
*ǵʰyem-, ǵʰeym- "winter"		ON gói "winter month"	hiems "winter"	kʰeĩma "winter"	híma- "winter", hemantá- "in winter" (cf. Hemanta (season))	Av zyā̊ (acc. zyąm, gen. zimō) "winter"	OCS zima "winter"	OPrus zeima "winter", Lith žiema "winter"	Gaul Giamonios "winter month"; (Note: Attested in the Coligny calendar, written in Gaulish language.) OIr gam "winter", gem-adaig "winter night"; OW gaem "winter"	jmeṙ "winter", jiwn "snow"	Gheg dimën, Tosk dimër(ë) "winter"	? A śärme "winter"; ? B śimpriye "winter". (Note: Douglas Q. Adams reads the words as "winter, wintry", although there are other interpretations.)	gimmanza "winter", gimi "in winter"
*semh₂- "summer"	summer (< OE sumor)	OHG sumar, OIc sumar "summer"			sámā "season; year"	Av ham- "summer"; Pers hâmin "summer"; Khot-Saka hamāñarva "summer season"			Gaul Samon(ios) "summer month"; OIr sam "summer"; OW ham, OBret ham "summer"	OArm am "year", amaṙn "summer"		A şme "summer"; B ṣmāye "summer" (adj.), ywārś-ṣmañe "midsummer"	
*wés-r̥, wes-n-és "spring"		ON vár "spring"	vēr "spring"	(w)éar "spring"	vasan-tá- "spring"	Av vaŋri "in spring"; OPers θūra-vāhara-	OCS vesna "spring"	OPrus wassara "spring", Lith vasara "summer", pavasaris "spring", vėsu "cool"	OIr errach "spring"< *ferrach < *wesr-āko-; OW guiannuin "in spring" < *wes-n̥t-eino-	garun "spring"< *wesr-			
*wet- "year", *per-ut- "last year"	wether "castrated male sheep" (< OE weþer),	OHG widar "male sheep", MHG vert "last year" <- *per-ut-, ON fjorð "last year" <- *per-ut-	vetus (veteris) "old"	(w)étos "year", pérusi "last year"	vatsá-, vatsará- "year", par-út "last year"	Sogdian wtšnyy (read wat(u)šanē) "old"	OCS vetŭchŭ "old"	OLith vẽtušas "old"	MIr feis, Cornish guis "sow" < *wet-si-	heru "last year" < *peruti	vit (pl. vjet) "year"		witt- "year"
*h₂et- "to go, year"		aþnam (Dat. Pl.) "years"	annus < atnus "year"		átati "(it) goes, walks, wanders"; hā́yana- "yearly"								
*yeh₁r- "year"	year (< OE ġēar)	jēr "year"	hōrnus "this year's" < *hōyōr-	hōra "time, year" < *yoH₁r-		Av yārə "year"	Russ. CH jara "spring"	OLith Jórė "spring festival"					
*h₂óyu "long time, lifetime"	OE ā "always"	aiws "eternity"	aevum aeternum, aeternitas "lifetime"		āyus "life, age" (as in the word āyur·veda, "knowledge of (long) life")				Gaul aiu- "eternity, longevity"				

== Ideas and rituals ==
PIE	English	Gothic	Latin	Ancient Greek	Sanskrit	Iranian	Slavic	Baltic	Celtic	Armenian	Albanian	Tocharian	Hittite
*ǵʰew- "to pour, libate, invoke"	god (< OE god < PIE. ǵʰutós "invoked, libated")	giutan "pour" ?guta "Goth"	fundō "I pour"		hotrá "libation"; hotṛ "priest, offerer of libations"; juhóti "to worship, sacrifice, present an oblation"; hóma "oblation, a Vedic ritual"						gumoj "I pour"		
*h₁yaǵ- "to sacrifice, worship"			ieientō "to eat breakfast"	hágios "devoted to the gods, holy, pious"	yájati "(s/he) worships"; yajña "worship, devotion, prayer"; yájus "religious reverence, worship, sacrifice";								
*ḱréddʰh₁eti "to believe" < *ḱred- "heart" + *dʰh₁eti "place" (See also *k̂erd-)			crēdō "I believe, I trust in, I confide in" (> creed, credo)		śraddhā́ "faith, trust, confidence, loyalty", śrad-dadʰāti "(he) trusts, believes"	Av zrazdā- "to believe" < *srazdā (Note: Influenced by zǝrǝd "heart".)			Old Irish cretim, W credaf "I believe"				
*gʷerH- "to praise, express approval; to elevate"			grātus "pleasing"; grātia "grace, thankfulness"; grātuītus "freely given, free"		járate "(s/he) praises, invokes"; gṛṇā́ti "(s/he) calls, invokes, mentions with praise, extols"; gūrtá- "agreeable, pleasing, lovely; approved, welcome"; gūrtí "approval, praise; benediction"		OCS žrĭti "to sacrifice"; žrĭtva "sacrifice, offering"; žrĭcĭ "priest"	Lith girti "to praise", geras "good"	OIr bard, W bardd "bard"		grah " to incite, to roar"		
*h₁wegʷʰ- "to promise, vow; praise"			voveō, vōtum "I vow, promise; dedicate, devote; wish for"	eúkhomai "I pray, vow, wish for; profess"; eûkhos "prayer, object of prayer; boast; vow"	óhate "(s/he) says"; ukthá "saying; sentence, verse; eulogy"	Av uxδa "word"							
*ḱwen-, *ḱwen-tos "holy"		hunsl "sacrifice"				Av spəṇta "holy"	OCS svętŭ "holy"	Lith šveñtas "holy", šventė "holiday, celebration", švęsti "to celebrate"					
*seh₂k- "holy"			sanciō "I render, appoint as sacred; devote, consecrate, dedicate"; sānctus "sacred, made inviolable; venerable, blessed, saintly"; sacer "sacred, holy, dedicated, consecrated; devoted"										

== Unclassified ==
PIE	English	Gothic	Latin	Ancient Greek	Sanskrit	Iranian	Slavic	Baltic	Celtic	Armenian	Albanian	Tocharian	Hittite
*gʰedʰ- "to unite, join, suit"	good (< OE gōd); gather (< OE gaderian); together (< OE togædere)	goþs "good"					godǔ "suitable time, holiday, feast, right time, time, term, year"; (Note: Range of meanings across the different Slavic languages); OCS godina "hour; time"; godĭnŭ "suitable"						
*bʰed- "to improve, make better"	better (< OE betera); batten (< ON batna "to grow better, improve, recover"); boot (Note: as in 'to boot', 'bootless') (< OE bōt "help, relief, advantage, remedy")	bota "gain, benefit, advantage" batiza "better"			bhadrá- "blessed, auspicious, fortunate, prosperous, happy; good, gracious, friendly, kind; excellent, fair, lovely, pleasant, dear"				W bodd "consent, will"		betë "good, right"		
*h₂el- "to grow, nourish"	old (< OE eald, ald); alderman (< OE ealdorman)	aljan "to cause to grow fat, fatten" alþeis "old"	*oleō (*olēre) "I grow"; alō (alere) "I foster, I nourish; I raise"; alimentum "food, nourishment; obligation to one's parents"; alumnus "nourished, fostered"; alimōnia "food, nourishment"; altus "high, tall"; indolēs "innate, inborn; talent"; adolescēns "growing up"; adultus "grown-up, matured"										
*h₃erdʰ- "to increase, grow; upright, high"			arbor (< OLat arbōs < PIta *arðōs) "tree (high plant)"; arduus "lofty, high, steep, elevated; arduous"	orthós "straight, upright, erect; straight forward"	ūrdhvá "rising, raised, erected; upright, high, above"; ṛ́ddhi "growth, increase; prosperity; elevation"								
*bʰeh₂g- "to divide, distribute, allot"	baksheesh (< Pers baxšidan "to give, grant, bestow")			éphagon "I ate, devoured (took my share)" > -phagy, (o)esophagus	bhakṣá- "food, drink, delight"; bhájati "to distribute, divide, allot, chooe, serve"								
*deh₂- *deh₂y- "to share, divide"	time (< OE tīma); tide (< OE tīd)			daíomai "I divide, share; host (a feast)"; dêmos "district, country, land; the common people; free citizens, sovereign people; deme"; daís "feast, banquet"; daitrós "one who carves and portions out meat at table"; daímōn "god, goddess; departed soul; demon"	dītí "brightness, time"; dā́ti, dyáti "(s/he) cuts, clips, mows, separates, divides"; dātrá- "allotted share"						ditë "day"		
*deh₂p- "to sacrifice, lose"	tap "hit lightly" (< OE tappen); tip "touch quietly, bump quietly" (< OE tippen)	ON tafn "sacrifice"	daps "a sacrificial or solemn feast, religious banquet; meal"; damnum < dapnum "damage, injury; (financial) loss; fine"	dáptō "I eat, devour; consume, corrode"; dapánē "cost, expenditure; extravagance"	dāpayati "(s/he) divides"				Ga duan "song, poem" (< PC *daunā)	tawn "feast"		A tāpal "food"	tappala- "person responsible for court cooking"
*delh₁- "to split, divide"	tell, teller (< OE tellen); tale (< OE talu); talk (< OE tealcian)		dolō "I hew, chop into shape; fashion, devise"; doleō "I hurt, suffer; I grieve for, lament"; dolor "pain, ache, hurt; anguish, grief, sorrow"		dalati "it bursts"; dālayati "(s/he) splits, cracks"; dala- "deal, portion, piece, half";		OCS delěti, odolěti "to overcome, defeat"; Russ dólja "share, fate"	Lith dalyti "to divide", dalinti "to divide, to share"	W delw "statue, image"				
*dʰayl- "part, watershed"	deal (< OE dǣl); dole (< OE dāl)	dails "part, portion, share"					OCS děliti "to divide"; OCS dělŭ "part"						
*bʰeh₂- "to shine, glow"			faveō "I favor"; favor "id"; faustus "favorable, fortunate"; fautor "patron, protector, promoter"	phaínō "I shine, appear, bring to light"	bhā́s "light"; bhānú "light, ray, sun"								
*bʰewg- "to enjoy, benefit"			fungor "I perform, execute, discharge; finish, complete, end" > fungible, defunct; fūnctiō "performance, execution (of a task)" > function		bhuj-, bhunákti "(s/he) enjoys; consumes, eats, drinks; uses, utilizes"								
*bʰruHg- "to make use of, have enjoyment of"	brook (< OE brūcan) "(old meaning) to use, enjoy"; Ger brauchen "to need, require"	brukjan "to use"	fruor "I enjoy, derive pleasure from"; frūctus "enjoyment, delight, satisfaction; produce, product, fruit; profit, yield, outcome" ⇒ (Note: fruit, fructose); frūmentum "corn, grain"; frūx, frūgēs "fruits of the earth, produce" > frugal										
*deyḱ- "to point out";	toe (< OE tā); token (< OE tācn); teach (< OE tǣċan)	gateihan "announce, proclaim, declare" PGmc *taihwǭ "toe"; *tīhwaną "to show, announce"	dīcō "I say, utter; mention, talk"; digitus "finger, toe, digit"	díkē "custom, manner, fashion; law, order, right; judgement, justice"; deîgma "specimen, sample; pattern"; deíknumi, "I point out, show"	diśáti "(s/he) points out, shows;teaches, informs; orders, commands, bids"; deśá- "point, region, spot, part; province, country"								
*h₂eyḱ- "to own, obtain, come in possession of"; *h₂eh₂óyḱe- "to possess, own"	own (< OE āgen); owe (< OE āgan); OE āga "owner"; ought, aught (< OE ǣht)	aigan "own, possess"			√īś, īṣṭe "(s/he) owns, possesses, is master of; rules"; īśá- "owning"; īśāná-, īśvara- "owner, master; ruler; epithets of the god Śiva"								
*seǵʰ- "to hold, overpower"	OE siġe "victory" < PGmc segaz (In personal names, e.g., Sigmund, Siegfried, etc.)	sigis "victory"; sigislaun "prize, spoils"	sevērus "severe, serious, strict, stern, stringent, austere, harsh, grave"	ékhō "I have, possess; hold, am able" ⇒ (Note: eunuch (lit. bed-keeper)); ískhō "I hold back, restrain; stay; hold fast, maintain"; iskhū́s "strength, power, might"; héxis "possession, act of having; a certain state, condition" ⇒ (Note: hectic); skhêma "form, shape, figure; appearance, show; bearing, look, air; stateliness, dignity; fashion, manner; character, persona; state, nature; species, kind; dance; sketch, outline, plan, scheme" ⇒ (Note: scheme, schematic); okhurós "firm, lasting, stout"; skholḗ "leisure, free time; rest; philosophy; place where lectures are given" ⇒ (Note: school, scholar, scholastic); Héktōr lit. "conqueror"; skhétlios "able to hold out, steadfast, unflinching"	sáhate "(s/he) overcomes, vanquishes, conquers, prevails; is able, capable; bears, endures"; sáhas "strength, power, force"; sā́ḍhṛ (Note: exact cognate of Héktōr) "conqueror"				Gaul Sego- (in personal and tribal names) "victory"				
*h₃erbʰ- "to change status, ownership"; *h₃órbʰos "servant, worker, slave; orphan"	erf "heritage, inheritance" (< OE erfe);	arbaiþs "labour, work, toil" arbja "heir" arbjo "heiress" Ger arbeit "work", Erbe heir	orbus "orphaned, parentless"	orphanós "orphan; childless; bereft"	árbha- "orphan; child; small"		OCS rabŭ "servant, slave" (< *ārbǔ); Czech orbota "hard work, slavery" > robot; Pol robić "to make, to do"						
*Hrew- "to tear out, dig out, open, acquire" (See also *Hrewp-, *Hrewk-)			rudis "rough, raw, uncultivated; unrefined, unskilled" ⇒ (Note: rude, rudimentary, erudite)		róman "hair, body hair"		OCS runo "fleece"						
ḱel- "to cover, to conceal"	helm; hall (< OE heall); hell (< OE hell/hel); hold (< OE healdan/haldan)	huljan "to cover, to wrap, to veil"; haldan "to hold"	cella "storeroom"; color "color" (< Proto-Italic *kelōs "oustside, aspect"); cilium "eyelid"; clam "secretly"; cālīgō "fog, mist, vapor"; cēlō "I conceal"	koleós "sheath"; kalúptō "I cover"; kalúbē "hut, cabin"; kéluphos "sheath, case"; kelébē "cup, jar"; kálpis "pitcher, cup"	śaraṇá "s/he protects, guards"			Latvian salis "frozen over"; Lithuanian šali̇̀s "land, region, periphery"					

== Bibliography ==
- Pokorny, Julius (1959). Indogermanisches etymologisches Wörterbuch.
- Dnghu. Proto-Indo-European Etymological Dictionary. (A revised edition of Julius Pokorny's Indogermanisches Etymologisches Wörterbuch, CCA-GNU)
- Beekes, Robert (1995). Comparative Indo-European Linguistics. J. Benjamins Pub. ISBN 1-55619-504-4.
- Beekes, Robert S. P. (2009). Etymological Dictionary of Greek. Brill Academic Publishers. ISBN 978-90-04-17418-4.
- Mallory, James; Adams, DQ (24 August 2006). The Oxford Introduction to Proto-Indo-European and the Proto-Indo-European World (2006 ed.). Oxford University Press. ISBN 0-19-928791-0.
- Kölligan, Daniel (2018). "The lexicon of Proto-Indo-European". Handbook of Comparative and Historical Indo-European Linguistics. pp. 2229–2279. doi:10.1515/9783110542431-045. ISBN 978-3-11-054243-1. S2CID 134708437.
- Delamarre, Xavier. Le Vocabulaire Indo-Européen. Paris: Librairie d'Amérique et d'Orient. 1984. ISBN 2-7200-1028-6
- Delamarre, Xavier (2003). Dictionnaire de la langue gauloise: Une approche linguistique du vieux-celtique continental. Errance. ISBN 9782877723695.
- Kloekhorst, Alwin. Etymological Dictionary of the Hittite Inherited Lexicon. Leiden Indo-European Etymological Dictionary Series 5. Leiden, The Netherlands; Boston, 2008. https://hdl.handle.net/1887/11996
- Matasović, Ranko. Etymological Dictionary of Proto-Celtic. Leiden, The Netherlands: Brill. 2009. ISBN 978-90-04-17336-1
- Monier-Williams, Monier (1960). A Sanskrit-English Dictionary. Oxford: Oxford Clarendon.
- Derksen, Rick (2008). Etymological Dictionary of the Slavic Inherited Lexicon. Leiden Indo-European Etymological Dictionary Series. Vol. 4. Brill.
- Derksen, Rick (2015). Etymological Dictionary of the Baltic Inherited Lexicon. Leiden Indo-European Etymological Dictionary Series. Vol. 13. Leiden, Boston: Brill. ISBN 978 90 04 27898 1.
