= Tocharian A =

Extinct Indo-European language in Asia

- Tokharian A, Eastern Tocharian, Agnean, Karashahrian, Turfanian
- tkaṃ
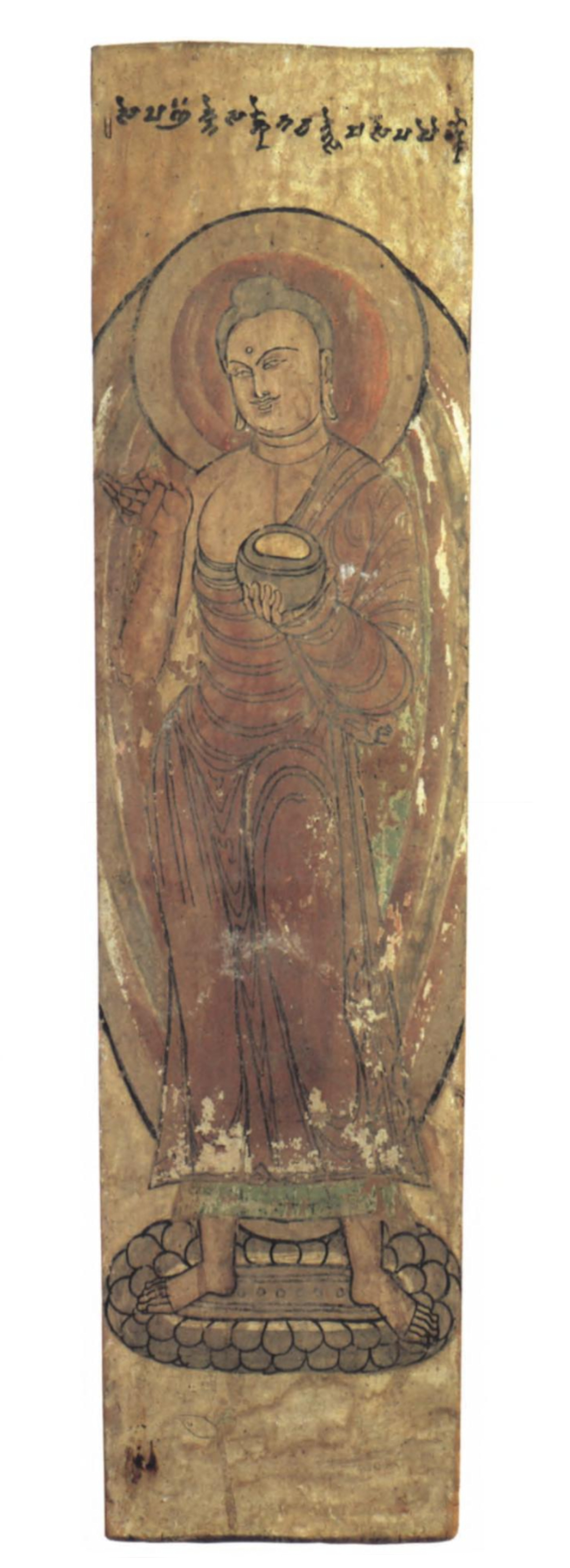
- Tocharian inscription "This Buddha was painted by the hand of Sanketava"
- Native to: Karasahr and Turfan
- Region: Tarim Basin
- Ethnicity: Tocharians
- Extinct: 850 AD
- Language family: Indo-European: Tocharian; Tocharian A
- Early form: Proto-Tocharian
- Writing system: Tocharian script; Brahmi script; Manichaean script

Language codes
- ISO 639-3: xto
- Glottolog: tokh1242
- Tocharian languages A (blue), B (red) and C (green) in the Tarim Basin. Tarim oasis towns are given as listed in the Book of Han (c. 2nd century BC), with the areas of the squares proportional to population.

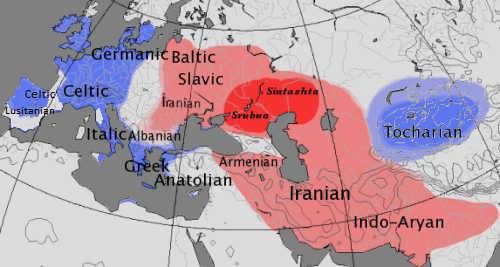
- Diachronic map showing the centum (blue) and satem (red) groups of Indo-European languages. Tocharian, on the right (East), is part of the centum group which initially formed a continuum, before the "satemization" appeared in the Eurasian Steppe.

Tocharian A, also known as Tokharian A, Eastern Tocharian, Agnean (tkaṃ), Karashahrian or Turfanian is an extinct language that was in use in the 1st millennium AD in the Karashahr and Turfan region of the Tarim Basin, present-day Xinjiang, Western China. First discovered from Buddhist texts dating back to around the 7th century AD, it coexisted with a related language, Tocharian B that together possibly with Tocharian C form the Tocharian branch of the Indo-European languages. This language was probably used in what the Han dynasty of China then called the Jushi Kingdom (around modern Turpan). It is believed that Tocharian A died out with the other Tocharian languages when the Uyghurs and the Yenisei Kyrgyz moved into the Tarim Basin.

== Writing ==
Tocharian A is known from around the 2000 manuscripts found. From these series of texts which are majority Buddhist liturgical texts are transcribed in a script derived from Brahmi. Unlike in Tocharian B, there are no secular texts in Tocharian A. One possible explanation is that at the time these texts were written, Tocharian A survived only as a liturgical language and Tocharian B would still have been a living language.

Another hypothesis, however, is that this absence is simply explained by the very fragmentary attestation of Tocharian languages in general.

From the work of Georges-Jean Pinault and Melanie Malzahn in 2007, it is now recognized that it was also a living, spoken language.

== Morphology ==
=== Nouns ===
The Tocharian A word for horse (yuk) is declined as follows:

Case	Tocharian A		
Case	Suffix	Singular	Plural
Nominative	—	yuk	yukañ
Genitive	—	yukes	yukāśśi
Oblique	—	yuk	yukas
Instrumental	-yo	yukyo	yukasyo
Perlative	-ā	yukā	yukasā
Comitative	-aśśäl	yukaśśäl	yukasaśśäl
Allative	-ac	yukac	yukasac
Ablative	-äṣ	yukäṣ	yukasäṣ
Locative	-aṃ	yukaṃ	yukasaṃ

=== Pronunciation ===
One of the innovations of Tocharian A is the presence of a sibilant consonant ṣ.

== Glossary ==
=== Words ===
The following are some examples of Tocharian A words with English words:

English	Tocharian A
always	skam
art	amok
away	lo
beyond	pät
cattle	śemäl
come	käm
despicable	appärmāt
enemy	yäslu
few	tsru
gift	el
go	kälk
god	ñkät
island	praṅk
lotus	oppal
net	sopi
or	pat
part	pāk
ready	ārṣal
root	tsmār
say	träṅk
serpent	ārwar
son	se
time	praṣt
water	wär

The following is also a comparison of some numbers in Tocharian A and other Indo-European languages:

English	Tocharian A	Spanish	French	German	Persian	Armenian
one	sas	uno	un	eins	yak	mi
two	wu	dos	deux	zwei	do	erku
three	tre	tres	trois	drei	se	erek'
four	stwar	cuatro	quatre	vier	cahar	cork'
five	pän	cinco	cinq	fünf	panj	hing
six	säk	seis	six	sechs	shesh	vec
seven	spät	siete	sept	sieben	haft	ewt'n
eight	okät	ocho	huit	acht	hasht	ut
nine	nu	nueve	neuf	neun	noh	inn
ten	säk	diez	dix	zehn	dah	tasn
hundred	känt	ciento	cent	hundert	sad	hariwr

=== Maitreyasamitināṭaka ===
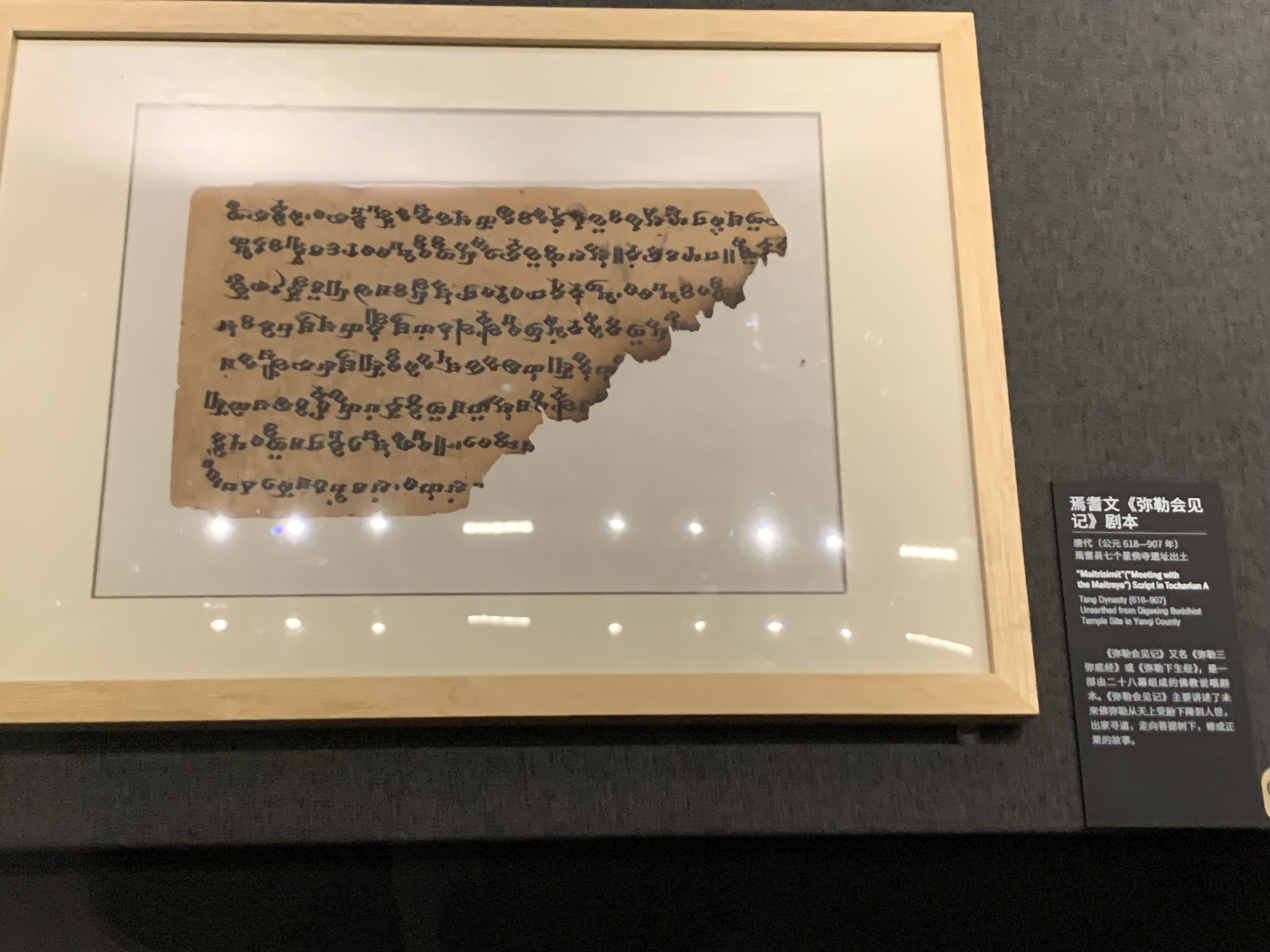
The Tocharian A version of the Maitreyasamitināṭaka.

The Maitreyasamitināṭaka is a Buddhist drama about the life of the Maitreya written in Tocharian A and is the most well-known Tocharian text about Maitreya. It was translated into Old Uyghur (where it is named Maitrisimit), which has been used to interpret Tocharian A. The Maitrisimit is not an exact translation as it was adapted to meet the requirements of Old Uyghur and the Maitreyasamitināṭaka was written in the campū style, which has a mixture prose and verse.

The following is one of the translations of the Tocharian A manuscript of Maitreyasamitināṭaka:

klā k. SA (23 syllables) (me)trakṣināṃ opṣlyā plāc weñeñc¨ˎkāvvintu yāmeñc¨ˎ///

[… through Metrak’s opṣly they would tell a speech (and) make verses. ///:]

ñ¨[ˎ]•klyoMA[nT]ˎ (20 syllables) (k)ly(o)MAnTˎ metraKAṃ oñantyo tri ñemintwaṃ KAlymeyā spārtwe(ñc¨ˎ) ///

[•noble /// beginning with noble Metrak in three jewels they would turn in the right manner ///:]

Pˎ metRAkyāp [w]. (18 syllables) ps. lāntuneṣi [abhi]ṣeKˎ artantRA•kus pat nu tanā SArki tu .i///

[of Metrak /// they praise anointing of sovereignty•hereafter ///:]

s weñeñc¨ˎ klyo(señc¨ˎ klyoMAnt metra) ◯[k]ṣ(i)nā(ṃ) plāc¨ˎ metRA(kyāPˎ) yärkanTˎ ārtantRA pālantRA anumodin yāmeñc¨ˎ pukāk ṣakk ats [c]e ///

[they would speak (panegyric(?) and hear) the speech (of noble Metrak,) praise (much) the
respect (of) Metrak, make gratification absolutely (and) surely ///:]

t pi koriSˎ ṢAk-KAnTˎ (w)r(asañ¨ˎ taṃ)◯ne KAtkeñc¨ˎ kātka[ṣ PA](lketSˎ?) ārkiśoṣṣaṃ PAttāñKATˎ: śmantRA cem wrasañ¨ˎ tām praṣṭaśśä[l] ..///

[(9)600 millions (people) would go across (in such a way). The brilliant(?) Buddha would stand
in the world : The people would come in (proper?) time ///:]

kyo napeṃsaṃ : ṣo«me» metRA[ky](āPˎ) (kl)[yo]señc¨ ˎ MArkampaL*ˎ tSAlpeñc¨ˎ kloPA(ṣ ṣome?) yomneñc¨ˎ puttiśparnac¨ˎ vyākariTˎ: TAmyo metRAkyāp kā /// (PA)-

[with … in (the world of?) people : Some would hear Dharma of Metrak, would be free (from)
suffering, (some?) would get the prophecy for the worth of Buddha : Then Metrak's ///:]

ls[k]asuntāPˎ skaMˎ skenaLˎ : 1 (4x25) || sātāgiri tRAṅKAṢˎ kāsu weñā(ṢTˎ)++Rˎ TAmyo TAṣ metRAkyāp waSA[mp]ātṣiṃ opṣlyac poñcäṃ ārki(ṣṣaṃ) ///

[one should endeavor always mindful … :•|| Sā tagiri says, “You said good … then so for opṣ aly
of attainment of Metrak (in) complete world:]

(purṇak)e t(RA)ṅKAṢˎ ceṣ ṣome ñäktañ¨ˎ epreRAṢˎ kāKArpuRAṢ*ˎ dak(ṣ)i(ṇāpapatha)[c]¨ˎ yiñc¨ˎ ṣome nu pāṣānak [ṣu]lac¨ˎ yiñc¨ˎ || sātā(giri tRAṅKAṢˎ dakṣiṇāpathˎ KAlymeyaṃ bādhari prāmne)

[(Pūrṇaka) says, “Some these gods, having descended from air space, go to Dakṣināpatha, some
also go to the mount Pāṣānaka” || Sāta(giri says, “In Dakṣiṇāpatha region(← direction) Brahmin Bādhari is):]

== Bibliography ==
- Lejeune, Michel (1938), 47. Mélanges de linguistique et de philologie offerts à Jacq. Van Ginneken., 1937. (in French), vol. 51, Revue des Études Grecques, pp. 548–549
- Maillard, Monique (1973), "Essai sur la vie matérielle dans l'oasis de Tourfan durant le Haut Moyen Âge.", École Pratique des Hautes Études. 4E Section, Sciences Historiques et Philologiques (in French), 105, École pratique des hautes études. 4e section, Sciences historiques et philologiques. Annuaire 1972-1973.: 741–744, doi:10.3406/ephe.1973.5679
- Levet, Jean-Pierre (2006), Tokharien ñäś et lituanien manęs : des jalons indo-euro-péens sur le chemin de l'eurasiatique ? (in French), Φιλολογία. Mélanges offerts à Michel Casevitz. Lyon : Maison de l'Orient et de la Méditerranée Jean Pouilloux, pp. 13–21 (Collection of the House of the Ancient Mediterranean Orient. Literary and Philosophical Series, 35)
- Mallory, J.P.; Mair, Victor H. (2000), The Tarim Mummies, London: Thames & Hudson, ISBN 0-500-05101-1.
