= Proto-Tocharian language =

Reconstructed proto-language

Proto-Tocharian
- Reconstruction of: Tocharian languages
- Region: Tarim Basin
- Era: 1500 BC - 600 AD
- Reconstructed ancestor: Proto-Indo-European
- Lower-order reconstructions: Agnean (Tocharian A); Kuchean (Tocharian B); Kroränian (Tocharian C)

Proto-Tocharian, also spelled Proto-Tokharian (/təˈkɛəriən/ or /təˈkɑːriən/), is the reconstructed proto-language of the extinct Tocharian branch of the Indo-European languages.

Proto-Tocharian is the unattested reconstructed ancestor of an Indo-European eponymous extinct branch, known from manuscripts dating from the 5th to the 8th century AD, which were on the northern edge of the Tarim Basin and the Lop Desert. The discovery of this language family in the early 20th century contradicted the formerly prevalent idea of an east–west division of the Indo-European language family on the centum–satem isogloss, and prompted reinvigorated study of the family.

The documents record two closely related languages, called Tocharian A (also East Tocharian, Agnean or Turfanian) and Tocharian B (West Tocharian or Kuchean). The subject matter of the texts suggests that Tocharian A was more archaic and used as a Buddhist liturgical language, while Tocharian B was more actively spoken in the entire area from Turfan in the east to Tumshuq in the west. A body of loanwords and names found in Prakrit documents from the Lop Nor basin have been dubbed Tocharian C (Kroränian). A claimed find of ten Tocharian C texts written in Kharoṣṭhī script has been discredited.

Tocharian A and Tocharian B, the two major languages descendant of Proto-Tocharian, are mutually unintelligible, which led linguists to think that the split of Proto-Tocharian in several branches was several centuries prior. As part of the same language family, the Tocharian languages and their common ancestor are studied together by scholars.

== Evolution ==
=== Sound changes ===
Proto-Tocharian underwent extensive phonological changes from Proto-Indo-European, including major vowel developments, consonant simplification, and widespread palatalization.

Laryngeal coloring: PIE laryngeals affected neighboring */e/ before being lost:
- */h₂e/ > */h₂a/ — *h₂énto "in front" > *h₂anto > *ā́nta
- */eh₂/ > */ah₂/ — *bʰreh₂tēr "brother" > *bʰrah₂tēr > *procer
- */h₃e/ > */h₃o/
- */eh₃/ > */oh₃/ — *n̥-ǵneh₃-tih₂ "ignorant" > *n̥ǵnoh₃tih₂ > *āknā́tsā
Loss of laryngeals: Laryngeals were gradually eliminated through several developments:
- Intervocalic laryngeals were lost, with identical vowels contracting into long vowels.
- The sequences ih₂ and uh₂ developed into ya and wa. — *wleh₂-nt-ih₂ "ruler (f.)" > *wlāntya > *wlāntsā
  - h₃ may have had the same effect.
- Laryngeals adjacent to vowels were lost, often causing compensatory lengthening of a preceding vowel. — *h₂wéh₁nt-o- "wind" > *wēnto- > *w'enta
- In syllabic resonant clusters, laryngeals were lost without lengthening. — *pr̥h₂wo- "anterior" > *pr̥wo- > *pä́rwa
- Laryngeals occurring between consonants developed into ə. — *ph₂tḗr "father" > *pətḗr > *pācer
- All remaining laryngeals were lost.
Centumization: The PIE palatovelars merged with the plain velars, eliminating the centum-satem distinction. - *h₁eḱwo- "horse" > *eḱwo- > *ekwo- > *yä́kwa
Glide insertion: A glide developed between high vowels and following vowels (iV, uV > iyV, uwV).
Loss of postnasal voiced aspirates: PIE bʰ and dʰ were lost between a nasal consonant and a following vowel.
Grassmann's law: When two voiced aspirated stops occurred within a word, the first lost its aspiration. It is not yet confirmed if this law existed in Proto-Tocharian.
Devoicing of voiced aspirates: The remaining voiced aspirated stops became voiceless aspirates. — *h₁rudʰ-ró- "red" > rudʰró > rutʰró > rä́tra
Devoicing in reduplicated forms: Stops that had lost aspiration through Grassmann’s law in reduplicated forms were also devoiced.
ə elimination:
- The sequences əyé and əyó contracted into ö́ː.
- Remaining ə merged with a. — *ph₂tḗr "father" > *pətḗr > *patḗr > *pācer
Word-final sibilant change: Word-final s became y in monosyllabic words.
Lowering of u before y: uy became oy before consonants and word-finally.
Loss of d before consonants: d was lost before consonants, except when occurring before syllabic resonants. — *weid-mo- > *weimo > *w'äima "thought"
- d was also possibly lost before rounded vowels.
Labial coalescence: wi combined into u, while Kʷi became Ku.
Vocalization of syllabic resonants: Syllabic resonants developed a new preceding ə (in contrast to the previous ə that had already merged with a). — *wl̥kʷo- "wolf" > *wəlkʷo- > *wä́lkʷa
Final nasal change: Word-final m became n. — *dekm̥ "ten" > dekəm > *dekən > *śä́kä
Dental nasal assimilation: m became n before dental consonants. — *sēm-s "one, only" > *sēns > *ṣe
Anaptyxis: ə was inserted into consonant clusters including a labial or velar consonant followed by st (Bst, Kst > Bəst, Kəst).
Cluster simplification: Several consonant clusters containing stops and resonants were reduced by deleting one consonant (t(ʰ)sk, nsC, PsR > tk, sC, PR).
Loss of final consonants: Word-final t, d, s, and n were lost. — *kʷetwór-es "four" > *kʷetwóre > *śätwárä.
- Final clusters of these consonants were also lost. — *sēm-s "one, only" > *sēns > *sē > *ṣe
- This sound change was inconsistently applied.
Loss of final i: Word-final i was lost after dental consonants unless stressed. After the loss of i, remaining word-final t and s were lost.
Dental affrication: Voiceless dental stops t(ʰ) followed by y or i developed into affricates. — *wleh₂-nt-ih₂ "ruler (f.)" > *wlāntya > *wlāntsa > *wlāntsā.
- Word-final tsi simplified to si after vowels.
ə raising: ə is raised to ɨ (written as "ä" by Tocharian scholars) — *h₁r̥gʷn̥tó- "dark" > *ərɡʷəntó > *ärɡʷäntó > *arkant.
Final oy monophthongization: Word-final oy became ẹː.
Loss of final glides: Word-final y and w were lost after long vowels. — *óḱtōw "eight" > *óktōw > *óktō > *óktu
- Additionally, w was lost in between a consonant and long uː.
Final o raising: Word-final or and oː became ur and uː, respectively. — *égʷʰō "to drink" > *ékʷʰō > *ékʷʰū > *yoku
Major vowel shift: The vowel system underwent a chain shift:
- o and oː became ə and əː. — *okʷs "eye" > *okʷ > *əkʷ > *ak
- aː became oː. — *bʰreh₂tēr "brother" > *pʰrātēr > *pʰrōtēr > *procer
- əː became aː. — *n̥-ǵneh₃-tih₂ "ignorant" > *ängnōtsa > *ängnə̄tsa > *ängnātsa > *āknā́tsā
- ə became ọ before rounded vowels through umlaut. — *óḱtōw "eight" > *ə́ktū > *ọ́ktū > *ọ́ktu
- Word-initial ɨ became ə. — *h₁r̥gʷn̥tó- "dark" > *ärɡʷäntə́ > *ərɡʷäntə́ > *arkant
Palatalization: All consonants (as well as any s and n before said consonant) were palatalized before front vowels (i(ː), e(ː), and ẹ(ː)). — *ph₂tḗr "father" > *patḗr > *patʲḗr > *pācer
- In addition, consonant + y sequences developed into palatalized geminates, except word-initially where gemination did not occur.
- This sound change was inconsistently applied. For example, i(ː) typically only palatalized dental consonants.
Vowel harmonization: The sequence a…öː became o…oː.
Initial glide formation: Word-initial i(ː), e(ː), and u(ː) developed initial glides (yi, ye, and wu). — *h₁eḱwo- "horse" > *ekwə > *yekwə > *yä́kwa
Labiovelarization: Velars before u and in between u and another consonant developed labialization (Ku, uKC > Kʷu, uKʷC).
High vowel merger: Short i, e, and u merged into ɨ, phonemicizing palatalization. — *medʰu "honey" > *mʲetʰu > *mʲätʰä > *m'ätä
Loss of vowel length: All vowel length distinctions were eliminated, phonemicizing all changes to vowels based on length. — *bʰreh₂tēr "brother" > *pʰrōtʲēr > *pʰrotʲer > *procer
Unrounding of ö: ö became e.
ɨ coloring: Before another vowel, ɨ was colored before a glide, giving iy, uw, and üwʲ.
Retroflexion of palatal sibilants: sʲ became ṣ, except before tʲ and kʲ. — *sēm-s "one, only" > *sʲe > *ṣe
Affrication of d: d and dʲ became dz and dzʲ, except before consonants or after n. — *dekm̥ "ten" > dʲäkä > *dzʲäkä > *śä́kä
Loss of aspiration: Remaining aspirated consonants lost aspiration. — *h₁rudʰ-ró- "red" > rätʰra > rä́tra
Palatal siblation: tsʲ and k(ʷ)ʲ became tɕ, and dzʲ and g(ʷ)ʲ became dʑ. Later both affricates simplified to ɕ and ʑ. — *gʷén-eh₂ "woman" > gʷʲäno > *dʑäno > *ʑäno > *śä́no
Labial strengthening: m became b before resonants.
Loss of voicing distinction: The contrast between voiced and voiceless obstruents was eliminated. — *dʰugh₂-tēr "daughter" > *tägātʲer > *täkātʲer > *täkā́cer
Palatalization complete: tʲ, sʲ, lʲ, and nʲ developed into tɕ, ɕ, ʎ, and ɲ respectively. — *ph₂tḗr "father" > *pātʲer > *pācer
Reduction of w sequences: In non-final positions, several sequences involving w were simplified:
- awə became a.
- əwə became ə.
- owə, əwɨ, awɨ, and unstressed uwə became o.
- ewɨ became ọ.
Initial resonant metathesis: In word-initial consonant clusters, resonant sequences were restructured:
- RɨC became ɨRC.
- Ruw became ɨRw.
- Rij became ɨRj.
- Rüwʲ became ɨRwʲ.
Umlaut:
- ə, e, and u became ọ and ɨ became u when a back vowel followed later in the word.
- The diphthong äu became ọ only when ọ followed later in the word.
- ə became a when a followed later in the word and ə was unstressed.
Velar nasal assimilation: nk became ŋk.
Stop deletion in clusters: Stops were lost in certain clusters (PNC and CPN).
Lateral assimilation: ln became ll.

== Phonology ==
=== Vowels ===
Proto-Tocharian shows radical changes in its vowels from Proto-Indo-European (PIE). Laryngeal e-coloring and vowel lengthening occurs as it does in most other branches, however, length distinctions eventually disappeared. Prior to the loss of length distinction, all pairs of long and short vowels became distinct in quality, and thus have different outcomes. Many pairs of PIE vowels are distinguished in Tocharian only by the occurrence or non-occurrence of palatalization.

Reconstructing the changes between PIE and Proto-Tocharian vowels is fraught with difficulty, and as a result there are a large number of disagreements among different researchers. The basic problems are:

- Tocharian A and B are relatively sparsely attested.
- The extensive mergers of PIE stop consonants lead to many ambiguities in the potential etymologies underlying particular Tocharian words.
- The radical restructuring of the vowel system means that few potential sound changes can be rejected as unreasonable, no matter how unlikely they may look on the surface.
- A large amount of analogical change has occurred in both the nominal and verbal systems, making it difficult to identify which changes are regular.

Historically, the evolution of the Tocharian vowels was the last part of the diachronic phonology to be understood. In 1938, George S. Lane remarked of Tocharian that "the vocalism so far has defied almost every attempt that has been made to bring it to order", and as late as 1945 still asserted: "That the subject [of palatalization] is a confused and difficult one is generally recognized—but so are most of the problems of Tocharian phonology." However, rapid progress towards understanding the evolution of the vocalic system, and with it the phonology as a whole, occurred during the period of approximately 1948–1960, beginning with Sieg and Siegling (1949). By 1960, the system was well-enough understood that Krause and Thomas's seminal work of that year is still considered one of the most important Tocharian grammatical handbooks.

Despite the apparent equivalence between the Tocharian A and B vowel systems, in fact a number of vowels are not cognate between the two varieties, and Proto-Tocharian had a different vowel system from both. For example, Tocharian A a reflects a merger of two Proto-Tocharian vowels that are distinguished in Tocharian B as e and o, while Tocharian B a reflects a stress-based variant of either Proto-Tocharian ā or ä, while Tocharian A preserves original ā and ä regardless of the position of stress.

As a general rule, Tocharian B reflects the Proto-Tocharian vowel system more faithfully than Tocharian A, which includes a number of changes not found in Tocharian B, e.g. monophthongization of diphthongs, loss of all absolutely final vowels, loss of ä in open syllables, and epenthesis of ä to break up difficult clusters (esp. word-finally) that resulted from vowel losses.

The following table describes a typical minimal reconstruction of Late Proto-Tocharian, which includes all vowels that are generally accepted by Tocharian scholars:

	Front	Central	Back
High	i /i/	ä /ɨ/	u /u/
Mid	e /e/?		ọ /o/
Low		ā /a/	o /ɔ/

The following table describes a "maximal" reconstruction of Proto-Tocharian, following Ringe (1996):

	Front	Central	Back
High	(i = ǝy)	ǝ /ɨ/	(u = ǝw)
Mid	ẹ /e/	ë /ə/	ọ /o/
Low	e /ɛ/	ā /a/	o /ɔ/

Some of the differences between the "minimal" and "maximal" systems are primarily notational: Ringe's *ǝ = standard *ä, and Ringe (along with many other researchers) reconstruct Proto-Tocharian surface *[i] and *[u] as underlying *äy, *äw (*ǝy, *ǝw in Ringe's notation). However, Ringe reconstructs three vowels *ë, *e, *ẹ in place of the single vowel *e in the minimal system. The primary distinction is between *ë < PIE *o, which is assumed to be a central rather than a front vowel because it does not trigger palatalization, and *e < PIE *ē, which does trigger palatalization. Other than palatalization effects, both vowels are reflected identically in both Tocharian A and B, and hence a number of researchers project the merger back to Proto-Tocharian. However, some umlaut processes are thought to have operated differently on the two vowels, and as a result Ringe (as well as Adams and some other scholars) prefer to distinguish the two in Proto-Tocharian. Ringe's *ẹ vowel, a higher vowel than *e, is fairly rare and appears as i in Tocharian B but e in Tocharian A. This vowel does trigger palatalization, and is thought by Ringe to stem primarily from PIE *oy and from loanwords. In general, Ringe's Proto-Tocharian reconstruction reflects an earlier stage than the one described by many researchers.

Some scholars use a different notation from what is given above: e.g. æ or ë in place of the e of the minimal system, å or ɔ in place of the o of the minimal system, and ǝ in place of ä. /ə/, not represented in the minimal system, can be represented with a or ë.

The palatalized labiovelar approximate w' likely allophonically colored the preceding ä into an /y/ like sound due to the differences in development between Tocharian A and B.

=== Stress ===
Proto-Tocharian had phonemic stress, although its position varies depending on the researcher. Many researchers project the Tocharian B stress that is recoverable from ā~a and a~ä alternations back to Proto-Tocharian. For the most part, this stress does not reflect PIE stress. Rather, most bisyllabic words have initial stress, and trisyllabic and longer words usually have stress on the second syllable. A number of multisyllabic words in Tocharian B appear to indicate that more than one syllable was stressed; it is thought that these reflect clitics or affixes that still behaved phonologically as separate words in Proto-Tocharian. Ringe, however, prefers to project the PIE stress unchanged into Proto-Tocharian, and assumes that the radically different system seen in Tocharian B evolved within the separate history of that language.

=== Consonants ===
The following table lists the reconstructed phonemes in Proto-Tocharian along with their standard transcription. Because its descendants are written in an alphabet used originally for Sanskrit and its descendants, the transcription of the sounds is directly based on the transcription of the corresponding Sanskrit sounds. The Tocharian alphabet also has letters representing all of the remaining Sanskrit sounds, but these appear only in Sanskrit loanwords and are not thought to have had distinct pronunciations in Tocharian. There is some uncertainty as to actual pronunciation of some of the letters, particularly those representing palatalized obstruents (see below).

	Bilabial	Alveolar	Alveolo-palatal	Palato-alveolar?	Palatal	Velar	Labialized velar
Plosive	p /p/	t /t/	c /tɕ/?^{2}			k /k/	
Affricate		ts /ts/					
Fricative		s /s/	ś /ɕ/	ṣ /ʃ/?^{3}			
Nasal	m /m/	n ṃ /n/^{1}			ñ /ɲ/	ṅ /ŋ/^{4}	
Trill		r /r/					
Approximant					y /j/		w /w/
Lateral approximant		l /l/			ly /ʎ/		

1. /n/ is transcribed by two different letters in the Tocharian alphabet depending on position. Based on the corresponding letters in Sanskrit, these are transcribed ṃ (word-finally, including before certain clitics) and n (elsewhere), but ṃ represents /n/, not /m/.
2. The sound written c is thought to correspond to a palatal stop /c/ in Sanskrit. The Tocharian pronunciation /tɕ/ is suggested by the common occurrence of the cluster śc, but the exact pronunciation cannot be determined with certainty.
3. The sound written ṣ corresponds to retroflex sibilant /ʂ/ in Sanskrit, but it seems more likely to have been a palato-alveolar sibilant /ʃ/ (as in English "ship"), because it derives from a palatalized /s/.
4. The sound ṅ /ŋ/ occurs only before k, or in some clusters where a k has been deleted between consonants. It is clearly phonemic because sequences nk and ñk also exist (from syncope of a former ä between them).

Phonetically, Proto-Tocharian is a centum Indo-European language, meaning that it merges the palatovelar consonants (*ḱ, *ǵ, *ǵʰ) of Proto Indo-European with the plain velars (*k, *g, *gʰ) rather than palatalizing them to affricates or sibilants. Centum languages are mostly found in western and southern Europe (Greek, Italic, Celtic, Germanic). In that sense, Proto-Tocharian (to some extent like the Greek and the Anatolian languages) seems to have been an isolate in the "satem" (i.e. palatovelar to sibilant) phonetic regions of Indo-European-speaking populations. The discovery of Tocharian languages contributed to doubts that Proto-Indo-European had originally split into western and eastern branches; today, the centum–satem division is not seen as a real familial division.

Unlike in most centum languages, Proto-Tocharian maintained separate outcomes of PIE *kʷ and *ḱw. The latter is still reflected as kw in Tocharian B, e.g. yakwe "horse" < PIE *eḱwos.

== Morphology ==
=== Nouns ===
Proto-Tocharian has completely re-worked the nominal declension system of Proto-Indo-European. The only cases inherited from the proto-language are nominative, genitive, accusative, and vocative (preserved in descendants, but Tocharian A lost the vocative case); in Proto-Tocharian the old accusative is known as the oblique case. In addition to these primary cases, however, each Tocharian language has six cases formed by the addition of an invariant suffix to the oblique case – although the set of six cases is not the same in each language, and the suffixes are largely non-cognate. For instance, the Tocharian B word yakwe, the Tocharian A word yuk < Proto-Tocharian *yä́kwë < PIE *h₁éḱwos, all meaning "horse", are declined as follows:

Case	Proto-Indo-European			Proto-Tocharian			Tocharian B			Tocharian A		
Case	Singular	Dual	Plural	Suffix	Singular	Plural	Suffix	Singular	Plural	Suffix	Singular	Plural
Nominative	*h₁éḱwos	*h₁éḱwoh₁	*h₁éḱwoes	—	*yä́kwë		—	yakwe	yakwi	—	yuk	yukañ
Vocative	*h₁éḱwe	*h₁éḱwoh₁	*h₁éḱwoes	—		—	—	yakwa	—	—	—	—
Genitive	*h₁éḱwosyo	*?	*h₁éḱwooHom	—			—	yäkwentse	yäkweṃtsi	—	yukes	yukāśśi
Accusative	*h₁éḱwom	*h₁éḱwoh₁	*h₁éḱwoms	—	*yä́kwë		—	yakwe	yakweṃ	—	yuk	yukas
Instrumental	*h₁éḱwoh₁	*?	*h₁éḱwōys				—	—	—	-yo	yukyo	yukasyo
Perlative	—	—	—				-sa	yakwesa	yakwentsa	-ā	yukā	yukasā
Comitative	—	—	—				-mpa	yakwempa	yakweṃmpa	-aśśäl	yukaśśäl	yukasaśśäl
Allative	—	—	—				-ś(c)	yakweś(c)	yakweṃś(c)	-ac	yukac	yukasac
Ablative	*h₁éḱwead	*?	*h₁éḱwomos				-meṃ	yakwemeṃ	yakweṃmeṃ	-äṣ	yukäṣ	yukasäṣ
Locative	*h₁éḱwey, *h₁éḱwoy	*?	*h₁éḱwoysu				-ne	yakwene	yakweṃne	-aṃ	yukaṃ	yukasaṃ
Causative	—	—	—				-ñ	yakweñ	yakweṃñ	—	—	—
Dative	*h₁éḱwoey	*?	*h₁éḱwomos	—	—	—	—	—	—	—	—	—

When referring to humans, the oblique singular of most adjectives and of some nouns is marked in both varieties by an ending -(a)ṃ, which also appears in the secondary cases. An example is eṅkwe (Toch B), oṅk (Toch A) "man", which belongs to the same declension as above, but has oblique singular eṅkweṃ (Toch B), oṅkaṃ (Toch A), and corresponding oblique stems eṅkweṃ- (Toch B), oṅkn- (Toch A) for the secondary cases. This is thought to stem from the generalization of n-stem adjectives as an indication of determinative semantics, seen most prominently in the weak adjective declension in the Germanic languages (where it cooccurs with definite articles and determiners), but also in Latin and Greek n-stem nouns (especially proper names) formed from adjectives, e.g. Latin Catō (genitive Catōnis) literally "the sly one" < catus "sly", Greek Plátōn literally "the broad-shouldered one" < platús "broad".

=== Verbs ===
In contrast, the verb verbal conjugation system is quite conservative. The majority of Proto-Indo-European verbal classes and categories are represented in some manner in Tocharian, although not necessarily with the same function. Some examples: athematic and thematic present tenses, including null-, -y-, -sḱ-, -s-, -n- and -nH- suffixes as well as n-infixes and various laryngeal-ending stems; o-grade and possibly lengthened-grade perfects (although lacking reduplication or augment); sigmatic, reduplicated, thematic and possibly lengthened-grade aorists; optatives; imperatives; and possibly PIE subjunctives.

In addition, most PIE sets of endings are found in some form in Proto-Tocharian (although with significant innovations), including thematic and athematic endings, primary (non-past) and secondary (past) endings, active and mediopassive endings, and perfect endings. Dual endings are still found, although they are rarely attested and generally restricted to the third person. The mediopassive still reflects the distinction between primary -r and secondary -i, effaced in most Indo-European languages. Both root and suffix ablaut is still well-represented, although again with significant innovations.

==== Categories ====
Proto-Tocharian verbs are conjugated in the following categories:

- Mood: indicative, subjunctive, optative, imperative.
- Tense/aspect (in the indicative only): present, preterite, imperfect.
- Voice: active, mediopassive, deponent.
- Person: 1st, 2nd, 3rd.
- Number: singular, dual, plural.
- Causation: basic, causative.
- Non-finite: active participle, mediopassive participle, present gerundive, subjunctive gerundive.

==== Classes ====
A given verb belongs to one of a large number of classes, according to its conjugation. As in Sanskrit, Ancient Greek and (to a lesser extent) Latin, there are independent sets of classes in the indicative present, subjunctive, perfect, imperative, and to a limited extent optative and imperfect, and there is no general correspondence among the different sets of classes, meaning that each verb must be specified using a number of principal parts.

===== Present indicative =====
The most complex system is the present indicative, consisting of 12 classes, 8 thematic and 4 athematic, with distinct sets of thematic and athematic endings. The following classes occur in Tocharian B (some are missing in Tocharian A):

- I: Athematic without suffix < PIE root athematic.
- II: Thematic without suffix < PIE root thematic.
- III: Thematic with PToch suffix *-ë-. Mediopassive only. Apparently reflecting consistent PIE o theme rather than the normal alternating o/e theme.
- IV: Thematic with PToch suffix *-ɔ-. Mediopassive only. Same PIE origin as class III.
- V: Athematic with PToch suffix *-ā-, likely from either PIE verbs ending in a syllabic laryngeal or PIE derived verbs in *-eh₂- (but extended to other verbs).
- VI: Athematic with PToch suffix *-nā-, from PIE verbs in *-nH-.
- VII: Athematic with infixed nasal, from PIE infixed nasal verbs.
- VIII: Thematic with suffix -s-, possibly from PIE -sḱ-.
- IX: Thematic with suffix -sk- < PIE -sḱ-.
- X: Thematic with PToch suffix *-näsk/nāsk-, combination of classes VI and IX.
- XI: Thematic in PToch suffix *-säsk-, combination of classes VIII and IX.
- XII: Thematic with PToch suffix *-(ä)ññ- < either PIE *-n-y- (denominative to n-stem nouns) or PIE *-nH-y- (deverbative from PIE *-nH- verbs).

Palatalization of the final root consonant occurs in the 2nd singular, 3rd singular, 3rd dual and 2nd plural in thematic classes II and VIII-XII as a result of the original PIE thematic vowel e.

===== Subjunctive =====
The subjunctive likewise has 12 classes, denoted i through xii. Most are conjugated identically to the corresponding indicative classes; indicative and subjunctive are distinguished by the fact that a verb in a given indicative class will usually belong to a different subjunctive class.

In addition, four subjunctive classes differ from the corresponding indicative classes, two "special subjunctive" classes with differing suffixes and two "varying subjunctive" classes with root ablaut reflecting the PIE perfect.

Special subjunctives:

- iv: Thematic with suffix i < PIE -y-, with consistent palatalization of final root consonant. Found in Tocharian B only, rare.
- vii: Thematic (not athematic, as in indicative class VII) with suffix ñ < PIE -n- (palatalized by thematic e, with palatalized variant generalized).

Varying subjunctives:

- i: Athematic without suffix, with root ablaut reflecting PIE o-grade in active singular, zero-grade elsewhere. Derived from PIE perfect.
- v: Identical to class i but with PToch suffix *-ā-, originally reflecting laryngeal-final roots but generalized.

===== Preterite =====
The preterite has 6 classes:

- I: The most common class, with a suffix ā < PIE Ḥ (i.e. roots ending in a laryngeal, although widely extended to other roots). This class shows root ablaut, with original e-grade (and palatalization of the initial root consonant) in the active singular, contrasting with zero-grade (and no palatalization) elsewhere.
- II: This class has reduplication in Tocharian A (possibly reflecting the PIE reduplicated aorist). However, Tocharian B has a vowel reflecting long PIE ē, along with palatalization of the initial root consonant. There is no ablaut in this class.
- III: This class has a suffix s in the 3rd singular active and throughout the mediopassive, evidently reflecting the PIE sigmatic aorist. Root ablaut occurs between active and mediopassive. A few verbs have palatalization in the active along with s in the 3rd singular, but no palatalization and no s in the mediopassive, along with no root ablaut (the vowel reflects PToch ë). This suggests that, for these verbs in particular, the active originates in the PIE sigmatic aorist (with s suffix and ē vocalism) while the mediopassive stems from the PIE perfect (with o vocalism).
- IV: This class has suffix ṣṣā, with no ablaut. Most verbs in this class are causatives.
- V: This class has suffix ñ(ñ)ā, with no ablaut. Only a few verbs belong to this class.
- VI: This class, which has only two verbs, is derived from the PIE thematic aorist. As in Greek, this class has different endings from all the others, which partly reflect the PIE secondary endings (as expected for the thematic aorist).

All except preterite class VI have a common set of endings that stem from the PIE perfect endings, although with significant innovations.

===== Imperative =====
The imperative likewise shows 6 classes, with a unique set of endings, found only in the second person, and a Proto-Tocharian prefix *pä- but unexpected connecting vowels occasionally occur, and the prefix combines with vowel-initial and glide-initial roots in unexpected ways. The prefix is often compared with the Slavic perfective prefix po-, although the phonology is difficult to explain.

Classes i through v tend to co-occur with preterite classes I through V, although there are many exceptions. Class vi is not so much a coherent class as an "irregular" class with all verbs not fitting in other categories. The imperative classes tend to share the same suffix as the corresponding preterite (if any), but to have root vocalism that matches the vocalism of a verb's subjunctive. This includes the root ablaut of subjunctive classes i and v, which tend to co-occur with imperative class i.

===== Optative and imperfect =====
The optative and imperfect have related formations. The optative is generally built by adding i onto the subjunctive stem. Tocharian B likewise forms the imperfect by adding i onto the present indicative stem, while Tocharian A has 4 separate imperfect formations: usually ā is added to the subjunctive stem, but occasionally to the indicative stem, and sometimes either ā or s is added directly onto the root. The endings differ between the two languages: Tocharian A uses present endings for the optative and preterite endings for the imperfect, while Tocharian B uses the same endings for both, which are a combination of preterite and unique endings (the latter used in the singular active).

==== Endings ====
As suggested by the above discussion, there are a large number of sets of endings. The present-tense endings come in both thematic and athematic variants, although they are related, with the thematic endings generally reflecting a theme vowel (PIE e or o) plus the athematic endings. There are different sets for the preterite classes I through V; preterite class VI; the imperative; and in Tocharian B, in the singular active of the optative and imperfect. Furthermore, each set of endings comes with both active and mediopassive forms. The mediopassive forms are quite conservative, directly reflecting the PIE variation between -r in the present and -i in the past. (Most other languages with the mediopassive have generalized one of the two.)

The present-tense endings are almost completely divergent between Tocharian A and B. The following shows the thematic endings, with their origin:

Thematic present active indicative endings
	Original PIE	Tocharian B		Tocharian A		Notes
	Original PIE	PIE source	Actual form	PIE source	Actual form	Notes
1st sing	*-o-h₂	*-o-h₂ + PToch -u	-āu	*-o-mi	-am	*-mi < PIE athematic present
2nd sing	*-e-si	*-e-th₂e?	-'t	*-e-th₂e	-'t	*-th₂e < PIE perfect; previous consonant palatalized; Tocharian B form should be -'ta
3rd sing	*-e-ti	*-e-nu	-'(ä)ṃ	*-e-se	-'ṣ	*-nu < PIE *nu "now"; previous consonant palatalized
1st pl	*-o-mos?	*-o-mō?	-em(o)	*-o-mes + V	-amäs	
2nd pl	*-e-te	*-e-tē-r + V	-'cer	*-e-te	-'c	*-r < PIE mediopassive?; previous consonant palatalized
3rd pl	*-o-nti	*-o-nt	-eṃ	*-o-nti	-eñc < *-añc	*-o-nt < PIE secondary ending

== Post-Tocharian developments ==
Further changes occurred during the evolution of Proto-Tocharian to Tocharian A and Tocharian B.

=== Tocharian A ===
- *e and *o merged into a, while *ẹ and *ọ became e and o respectively.
- *a was backed to o under a limited set of environments (#_B, #_ṅkw, #C'_m, ...m_l)
- Labiovelar *kʷ (including kw) lost its labialization in Tocharian A, frequently rounding adjacent vowels (*a, *ä > o, u).
- *wā became o after labial consonants.
- *w' and üw' depalatalization, reverting to w and uw.
- Many developments occurred with consonant clusters containing sibilants. *st became ṣt, medial *ks and *kṣ became ps and pṣ, *nṣ and *ñś simplified to ṣ and ñ, and ns simplified to s.
- The simplification of *ns to s palatalized the preceding vowel. The cluster ñc also palatalized the preceding vowel. These vowel palatalizations are as follows:
  - *a > e
  - *ā > e
  - *ä > i
- Word-final *n was lost, initially nasalizing the preceding vowel. The nasalization was later lost, though not before nasal /ɨ̃/ became i.
- Word-final vowels were lost in multisyllabic words unless preserved through the previously mentioned nasalization. As a result, newly word final *y and *w became vowels after consonants.
- ä was inserted to break up word-final stop clusters (PP#) and word-final consonant-resonant clusters (CR#).
  - Example of the above two changes: PToch *rä́tre (from PIE *h₁rudhros) > *rä́tr > *rä́tär > Toch A rtär.
- *ā was weakened to a when the previous syllable contained e, a, o, or ā. Subsequently, *a then became ä in the same environment when a occurred in the following syllable.
- *ä was lost in open syllables (*rä́tär > rtär).
- *w was lost in between consonants, *w before dental consonants was metathesized and became p (*wD > Dp), and *wä became u after consonants.
- *y after a palatal consonant was assimilated, producing a geminate palatal consonant (*C'y > C'C').
- *t assimilated to c when c followed later in the word (*t…c > c…c).
- Many diphthongs were monothongized before a consonant or word finally:
  - *āi, *ai, *oi > e
  - *āu, *au > o
  - *iy > i
  - *uw > u

=== Tocharian B ===
- *a umlauted to ā before ā, after which all remaining *a merged with e.
- Palatalized labials and resonants (*p', *m', and *r') lost their palatalization. Before doing so, *p' and *m' fronted following *ä to i. By contrast, *w' and *üw' became y and iy.
- Word initial glides *yi, *wu, and *wo were deleted, becoming i, u, o respectively. Additionally, *y was lost after *ṣ.
- *ẹ and *ọ became i and o respectively
- As in Tocharian A, inherited *kʷ lost its labialization. However, inherited *kw became kʷ and was preserved as a labiovelar. Before this, *kʷäkʷ colored its vowel to *kʷokʷ (later kok).
- An epenthetic ä was inserted to break up non-initial consonant–resonant clusters unless the preceding vowel was also ä.
- Proto-Tocharian stress was largely retained but underwent systematic reorganization:
  - Stress on ä preferentially shifted to the preceding non-ä vowel, otherwise to the following non-ä vowel.
  - Subsequently, stressed vowels outside the first syllable shifted their stress to the following syllable.
- *ä is lost; unstressed in coda position, between an approximate and a consonant, and before t or s outside the first syllable.
- Conditioned vowel changes before glides (*āy > oy; *eGC > aGC).
- In disyllabic words, stress was ultimately fixed on the first syllable.
- Unstressed *ā became a, while stressed *ä became a.
- Following a vowel, *w was assimilated to a preceding dental consonant, producing a geminate.
- *pn became mn and Intervocalic *mn underwent metathesis to nm.
- An epenthetic t developed between nasals or resonants and following siblants (*NS > NtS; *RS > RtS). Conversely, *t was lost from initial *tk clusters and from *Rtk clusters (*#tk > k; *Rtk > Rk).
- Word-final *s was lost after n.

=== Vowel development ===
The following table shows the most basic changes from Proto-Indo-European (PIE) to Proto-Tocharian (PToch) and on to Tocharian B (TB) and Tocharian A (TA), using the notation of the "minimal" system and using a for /ə/:

Late PIE	PToch	Tocharian B	Tocharian A	Example
a, Ḥ	ā	ā́; a	ā	PIE *h₂ént-o- "in front" > *ánt-o- > PToch *ā́nta > TB ānte, TA ānt PIE *pḥ₂tḗr "father" > PToch *pācer > TB pācer, TA pācar
e	yä	+á; +ä, +—	+ä, +—	PIE *h₁eḱwo- "horse" > PToch yä́kwë > TB yakwe PIE *gʷén-eh₂ "woman" > *gʷén-ā > PToch śä́no > TB śana, TA śäṃ PIE *kʷetwór-es "four" > PToch *śätwárä > TB śtwer, TA śtwar
i	ä, yä	(+)á; (+)ä, (+)—	(+)ä, (+)—	PIE *wiso- "poison" > PToch *wä́sa > TB wase, TA wäs
o	a	e	a	Late PIE *okʷs "eye" > PToch ëak > TB ek, TA ak
or#	är	ár; är	är	
u	(w)ä	(w)á; (w)ä, —	(w)ä, —	PIE *h₁rudʰ-ró- "red" > PToch rä́tra > TB ratre, TA rtär (< *rtr) PIE *dʰugh₂-tēr "daughter" > PToch *täkā́car > TB tkācer, TA ckācar
ā	o	o	a	Late PIE *bʰrā́tēr "brother" > PToch *procar > TB procer, TA pracar
ē	ye	+e	+a	PIE *h₂wéh₁nt-o- "wind" > *wēnt-o- > PToch *w'enta > TB yente, TA want
ō	ā	ā́; a	ā	PIE *ṇ-ǵneh₃-tih₂ "ignorant" (Latin ignōtus) > *ṇ-ǵnō-tyḤ > PToch āknā́tsā > TB aknātsa
ō#	ū	u	—	Late PIE *égʷʰō "to drink" > PToch *yoku > TB yoku
ih₁	i?	i?	i?	
ih₂, ih₃	yā	+ā́; +a	+ā	
uh₁	u?	u?	u?	
uh₂, uh₃	wā?	wā́;wa?	wā?	
ai	āi	ai	e	
ei	yäi	+i	+i	
oi	āi	ai	e	
oi#	ẹ̄	i	e	
au	āu	au	o	
eu	yäu	+u	+u	
ou	au	e_{u} > au	o	
ēu	yāu	+au	+o	
Ṛ, ṚH	äR	áR; äR, R	äR, R	PIE *wḷkʷo- "wolf" > PToch *wä́lkʷa > TB walkwe PIE *pṛh₂wo- "anterior" (cf. Sanskrit pū́rva-) > PToch *pä́rwa > TB parwe, TA pärwa-t
#Ṛ, #HṚ	aR	eR	aR	PIE *h₁ṛgʷṇtó- "dark" > PToch *arkant > TB erkent, TA arkant

Notes:

1. A + sign indicates palatalization. When following a consonant, that consonant is palatalized; otherwise, a y appears. Before PIE i, consonants other than dentals are not necessarily palatalized (researchers differ on what exactly happened); this is indicated as (+).
2. PIE u also inserts a w word initially, indicated as (w).
3. A – sign indicates no vowel; this results from deletion of ä in open syllables.
4. Tocharian B reflects Proto-Tocharian central vowels (ä, ā) differently depending on whether they bore stress or not. This is indicated in the table above: stressed ä ā > a ā while unstressed ä ā > ä a (i.e. Tocharian B a reflects either stressed ä or unstressed ā). An additional complication is that unstressed ä is deleted in open syllables.
