= Georges-Jean Pinault =

French linguist (born 1955)

- Born: 4 July 1955 (age 71)

Academic background
- Education: École normale supérieure University of Sorbonne Nouvelle; École pratique des hautes études

Georges-Jean Pinault (French pronunciation: [ʒɔʁʒ ʒɑ̃ pino]; born 4 July 1955) is a French linguist who is professor of linguistics at the École pratique des hautes études. He is one of the leading experts on Tocharian languages and has published more than two hundred articles on Indo-European linguistics. He is one of the editors of the journal Tocharian and Indo-European Studies.

== Biography ==
Born on 4 July 1955, Georges-Jean Pinault studied at the École Normale Supérieure (1974–1980), then at the University of Sorbonne Nouvelle and the École pratique des hautes études (EPHE). Initially teaching at Sorbonne Nouvelle, he later became professor at Blaise Pascal University, then director of research at the EPHE.

He is well known for having discovered Pinault's law, according to which laryngeals are lost word-medially following a consonant and before a yod: *hₓ > ∅/ C __ y

== Bibliography ==
Monographs

- Sites divers de la région de Koutcha. Épigraphie koutchéenne (avec Chao Huashan, Simone Gaulier et al.) = Mission Paul Pelliot (Documents conservés au Musée Guimet et à la Bibliothèque Nationale), t. VIII, Paris, Instituts d’Asie du Collège de France, 1987. « Épigraphie koutchéenne : I. Laissez-passer de caravanes.- II. Graffites et inscriptions », p. 59-196, 57 planches de photographies.
- Introduction au tokharien. In : Lalies 7. Actes de la session de linguistique d’Aussois (27 août-1er septembre 1985), Paris, 1989, p. 5-224. Cinq chapitres : I. Données externes.- II. Phonologie.- III. Morphologie nominale.- IV. Morphologie verbale.- V. Lecture de textes
- Fragments of the Tocharian A Maitreyasamiti-Nâtaka of the Xinjiang Museum (China).Transliterated, translated and annotated by Ji Xianlin, in collaboration with Werner Winter and Georges-Jean Pinault, Berlin-New York, Mouton de Gruyter (Trends in Linguistics. Studies and Monographs 113), 1998, 392 pages, 88 planches de photographies.
- Chrestomathie tokharienne. Textes et grammaire, Leuven-Paris, Peeters (Collection linguistique publiée par la Société de Linguistique de Paris, t. XCV), 2008, 692 pages.
- Dictionary and Thesaurus of Tocharian A. Volume 1: a-j. Compiled by Gerd Carling in collaboration with Georges-Jean Pinault and Werner Winter, Wiesbaden, Harrassowitz Verlag, 2009, XXXIX+204 pages.
