= Pinault's law =

Phonological rule

Pinault's law (/piˈnoʊ/ pee-NOH) is a Proto-Indo-European (PIE) phonological rule named after the French Indo-Europeanist Georges-Jean Pinault who formulated the modern understanding of the law. The phenomenon was first noticed by Jacob Wackernagel, who—in his 1896 work Altindische Grammatik—described what was then referred to as schwa deletion. Wackernagel originally cited the example of the Sanskrit root vad(i)- ("to speak"), which has forms such as uditá ("said, spoken") besides udyáte. This particular root is no longer necessarily an example of Pinault's law, as the PIE root is now sometimes reconstructed as *h₂wed-, without a laryngeal, though it is also reconstructed by some as *h₂wedH-. Nevertheless, in a 1982 publication, Pinault himself provided additional examples of the sound law, and developed a revised version of the rule adapted to modern laryngealist theory. It is this updated version that is now accepted as Pinault's law.

According to this rule, PIE laryngeals disappear word-medially between an underlying non-syllabic consonant (i.e. an obstruent or sonorant) and *y. Examples can be seen in the formation of imperfective verbs by appending *-yeti to the stem. Compare:

- PIE root *werh₁- 'to say' → imperfective *wéryeti 'to be saying' (cf. Ancient Greek εἴρω, eirō, 'to tell')
- PIE root *h₂erh₃- 'to plow' → imperfective *h₂éryeti 'to be plowing' (cf. Old Irish airid 'to be plowing')
- PIE root *sneh₁- 'to spin' → imperfective *snéh₁yeti 'to be spinning' (cf. Old Irish sníid, 'to spin'). Here the laryngeal */h₁/ is not deleted since it is preceded by a vowel.

The linguist Andrew Byrd argues that Pinault's law was motivated by an aversion to palatalized pharyngeals. The *h₂ and *h₃ are often, though not universally, thought to represent pharyngeal consonants, in which case they would approximate a palatalized pharyngeal when adjacent to *y. Palatalized pharyngeals are extremely difficult to articulate, and consequently they are rare cross-linguistically, with Byrd noting that a survey of 693 languages found no examples of such phonemes in any language's sound inventory. Avoidance of *H + *y sequences must have only applied should the two sounds have occurred in the same syllable, as other reconstructable PIE words clearly showcase heterosyllabic *Hy clusters, such as in the verb *(s)téh₂yeti ("to steal"). This particular word may have been syllabified as *[(s)tah₂]_{σ}[ye-], whereas a form such as *sokʷyós (perhaps from *sokʷh₂ṓy) may have emerged from underlying *[sokʷ]_{σ}[h₂yo-]. Words such as *dh₂yétor (whence Sanskrit dáyate) and *(s)ph₂yéti (whence Ancient Greek σπάω (spáō)) may have escaped the action of Pinault's law due to schwa epenthesis in *(C)CHC sequences, according to which they should have been realized as [dəh₂yétor] and [(s)pəh₂yeti]. If this version of Pinault's law is accepted, then it must have only applied to *h₂ and *h₃, as *h₁ was probably a glottal consonant. This rendition of the rule would explain the retention of the laryngeal in forms such as Latin secō ("to cut"), which may reflect *sekh₁-ye-ti. According to this interpretation, the only permissible word-initial *Hy sequence was *h₁y, which would naturally entail that all initial *Hy sequences are to be reconstructed as such. This would not necessarily disprove the reconstruction of forms such as *h₂y-(e)w-gʷih₃- on the basis of reflexes such as Ancient Greek ὑγιής ("hugiḗs;" sound, healthy); it would merely require that these forms have surfaced as *y(e)wgih₃ in PIE on account of Pinault's law and the boukolos rule.

== See also ==
- Glossary of sound laws in the Indo-European languages
