= History of Turpan =

History of Turpan Basin, of northwest China

The history of Turpan is the history of the Turpan Basin in northwest China.

== Ancient ==
The indigenous people living in the Turpan Basin were Indo-European Tocharian gurus. They established the Gushi (later called Che Shi) state, Huhu State, Xiaojin County, Che Shi Empress Cheng State, and Che Shi Du Wei State on the Turpan Basin. In 138 BC, Zhang Qian was sent on a diplomatic mission to the Western Regions to unite the countries there. Therefore, the Western Han Dynasty and the Xiongnu launched a long-term and repeated struggle for Gu Shi. In 108 BC, the Han generals Zhao Ponu and Wang Hui led tens of thousands of cavalry to occupy Loulan and Gu Shi. Gu Shi renamed Che Shi, minister belongs to the Western Han Dynasty.Chishi division to Bogda Peak north and south to form Che Shi division country. Soon, the Huns took control of the chariot division. In 99 BC, the Han dynasty took Jie and Wang Chengyao, the general of Xiongnu, as Kailing Marquis, led Loulan troops to attack Che Shi, and the Xiongnu sent king Xian to rescue tens of thousands of horses, and the Han army was defeated. In 89 BC, The Han dynasty sent Marquis Kailing to lead loulan and other troops of the six states to surround the Che Division, and the Che Division king surrendered to the Han Dynasty. In 74 BC, the Huns reoccupied the chariot division and sent 4,000 cavalry to camp here. In 71 BC, the combined forces of the Han dynasty and Wusun attacked the Xiongnu from the east and the west. The Xiongnu soldiers fled in fear from the Chariot division, which belonged to the Han Dynasty. Later, the Che Shi king married with Xiongnu, and the Han lost Che Shi. In 68 BC Zheng Ji, the chief servant of the Han Dynasty, led the army to seize the city of Jiaohe, the che Division, and sent 300 soldiers to camp the che Division. Xiongnu sent troops to fight again. Han gave up Che Shi in 62 BC. In 60 BC, the Xiongnu were in turmoil, and the King of Xiongnu led his people to surrender to the Han. The land of Che Shi then belonged to the Han Dynasty. These five major Che Shi, known as the "five Che Shi". In the same year (60 BC) when the Western Han Dynasty unified the Western Regions, zheng Ji was established as the first commander of the Western Regions. After the che division was handed over to Han, Han "divided [it] into the former king of che Division and the six states in the north of Shan", among which the former state of Che Division was located in the south of Bogda Peak and now in Turpan. In BC 48, the Han Dynasty in the che division of the country before the establishment of wu-already lieutenant, stationed in Jiaohe City, in charge of the western Regions tuntian affairs. In BC 21, Wu had moved to Gaochangbi (now Gaochang old City of Turpan City). To 25 AD Che Shi before the state had all annexed the territory of Turpan states, Jiaohe city became the first political, economic, and cultural center of Turpan. After 75 AD, the Xiongnu besieged Che Shi, and fought with the Han Dynasty repeatedly. Wu had been withdrawn and restored several times. In 123 AD, Shi Banyong, commander of the Western Regions, led 500 troops to Lukeqin (now Lukeqin, Shanshan County) and conquered the chariot division. In 124 AD, Captain Wu-yi was reinstated.

== Middle Ages ==
Many Han and Sogdian people settled in Turpan during the later Han era, and the oldest evidence of the use of Chinese characters is found in a document in Turpan dating back to A.D. 273. During the Wei and Jin Dynasties, in order to escape the war in China's interior, many Han people moved to Gaochang and assimilated with the local aborigines. The Jin Dynasty was still located Gaochang. Qianliang was founded in Liangzhou (now Wuwei, Gansu) after the fall of the Western Jin Dynasty. In 327, zhang Jun, the former king of Liang, captured Gaochang and zhao Zhen, a renegade commander of Wuyi, and set Gaochang County as Tiandi County. Under shazhou (now Dunhuang, Gansu province). In 376, Fu Jian of the former Qin Dynasty destroyed Qianliang. Gaochang county is a former Qin, under liangzhou. In 386, lv Guang, a former Qin general who was ordered to attack Qiuci (now Kuqa, Xinjiang) in the west, broke the Iwu Pass and occupied Liangzhou. After the establishment of Liang, Gaochang, Che Shi before the country is Liang. In 394, Lu Guang sent his son Lu Pu to defend Gaochang in the western regions. In 397, Duan Ye, the prefect of Later Liang Jiankang (southwest of modern Jiuquan, Gansu province), became the chief governor of Liangzhou Mu, duke of Jiankang, and changed his name to Shen Xi, occupying Gaochang. In 400 years, Li Hao established Xiliang and set up a county in Gaochang. The former minister of the Che Shi division belongs to Xiliang. In 412, Northern Liang was founded by Mengxun Drainage. In 420 AD, Mengxun Drainage, the main plain of Northern Liang, was defeated in Xiliang, Gaochang Was moved to Northern Liang. In 439, beiliang was destroyed by the Northern Wei, and Kan Shuang was appointed governor of Gaochang. The remnants of north Liang west shanshan (now Ruoqiang County border). In 442, under the leadership of Ju Qu Wuyi, the remnants of The North Liang captured Gaochang, and in the next year it was renamed Chengping, known as King of Liang. And attack the chariot division in the west. In 450, The king of Chishi joined the army of Wei to march west. Zuqu anzhou and Rouran took the opportunity to unite their troops and occupied The Chishi.

In 460 AD, the Rouran killed King Gaochang, the Gaochang people established Kan Bozhou as the king of Gaochang with Gaochang City as the capital, and established a local Han dynasty. Gaochang City became the political, economic, and cultural center of Turpan. In 481, the Gaochang people established Zhang Mengming as the king of Gaochang. In 496 AD, the Gaochang people killed Zhang Mengming and made Ma Ru the king. In 501 AD, the Gaochang people killed Ma Ru and established Qu Jia as king. The Gaochang Kingdom of the Koji family had been attached to the Rouran, Gaoche, and Turks successively, surrendered to the Northern Wei, Western Wei, Zhou and Sui, and was canonized by them. The kingdom was established as a county and a city system. The county was divided into townships, and the countryside was divided into li. Beginning from Kan Bozhou, Turpan entered the period of Gaochang Kingdom. The Gaochang Kingdom had three counties of Jiaohe, Tiandi, and Nanping; fourteen counties including Baisu, Yongan, Wuban, Yancheng, Liupo, Shichang, Lin, Xinxing, Longquan, Anchang, Jiuquan, Weishen, and Changchuan; and seven cities being Gaoning, Linchuan, Ningrong, Yongchang, Zhucheng, Dujin, and Dongzhen. In 639, Gao Chang rebelled against the Tang Dynasty, joined the Western Turks, and blocked the passage to the Western Regions. In 640, the Tang sent the Minister of Personnel, Hou Junji, to lead the army to attack Gaochang as the chief general of the Jiaohe Road march. After the pacification of Gaochang, Xichang Prefecture was established and changed to Xizhou. Gaochang County, Liuzhong County, Jiaohe County, Tianshan County (in present-day Toksun County), and Puchang County (in present-day Shanshan County). In the same year when the Tang Dynasty established Xizhou, Anxi Datuhu was established in Jiaohe City, with Qiao Shiwang as the first Anxi Duhu and the governor of Xizhou. Anxi Daduhufu has jurisdiction over 22 Duhufu and 118 states. In 648, the Anxi Dadu Hufu moved to Qiuci. In 651, he returned to Xizhou. In 658, he moved to Qiuci again. The Western State was changed to the Governor's Office of the Western State. In 662, the Tubo army entered the Western Regions and began to compete with Tang Changnian for the Western Regions. In 670, the joint forces of Tubo and Western Turks captured the eighteen prefectures in the Western Regions. Tang abandoned the four towns of Anxi and retreated to Xizhou. In 689, Anxi Daduhufu was relocated to Xizhou. In 692, it moved to Qiuci. In 714, Tang set up the Tian Shan Army at the border of Xizhou. In 742, Xizhou was changed to Jiaohe County. In 758, the original construction of Xizhou was restored. In 790, Tubo and Uighur competed for the North Court (now Jimsar), and Tubo occupied the North Court. Subsequently, the capture of Xizhou.

== Late Antiquity ==
In 803, the Uighur Khanate seized Gaochang from the Tibetans, but the capital of the Uighur Khanate in Mongolia was sacked by the Kirgiz in 840, causing the Uighurs to migrate out of Mongolia on a large scale and disperse to Gansu and Central Asia, with many moving into Turpan. In 866, the Uyghur servants of the northern court, Gujunke Xizhou, established the Gaochang Uyghur Kingdom with Gaochang as the center, and the capital Gaochang City. Historically known as "Xizhou Uighur" or "Gaochang Uighur", it was later controlled by the Western Liao Dynasty. The last king left the Turpan area in 1284 for Hami to seek protection from the Mongols, but the local Uighur Buddhist rulers remained in power until 1389. At the beginning of the 15th century, Chen Cheng, an envoy of the Ming Dynasty, visited this place by land, and described the Buddha statues and temples in Turpan in his "Xiyu Fan Guo Zhi". In 1420, the Timurid envoy Gyat Al-Din Naqash, en route from Herat to Peking via Turpan, reported that many of the city's inhabitants were "infidels" and that he visited a "large and very large building". "Beautiful" temple with a statue of Sakyamuni and claims that many Turpan people "worship the cross". But by the second half of the 15th century, the region conquered by the Chagatai Khanate had been Islamized.
