= Tocharian script =

Script used to write the Tocharian languages

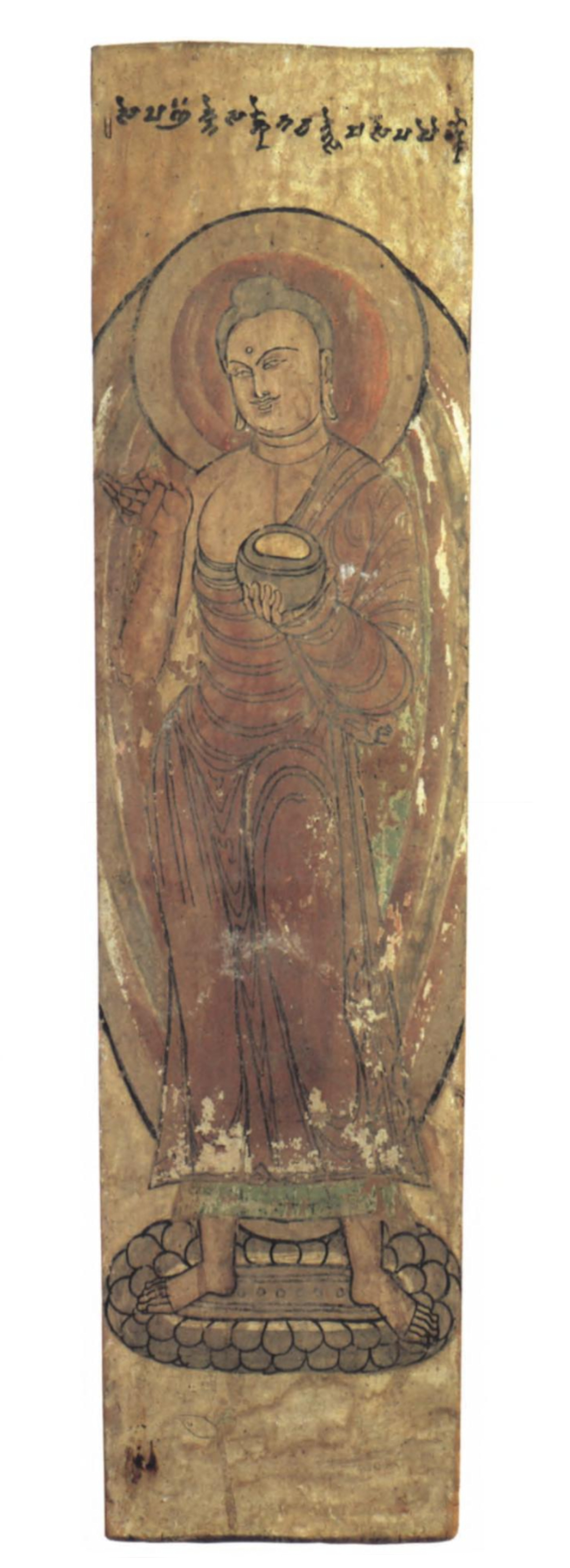
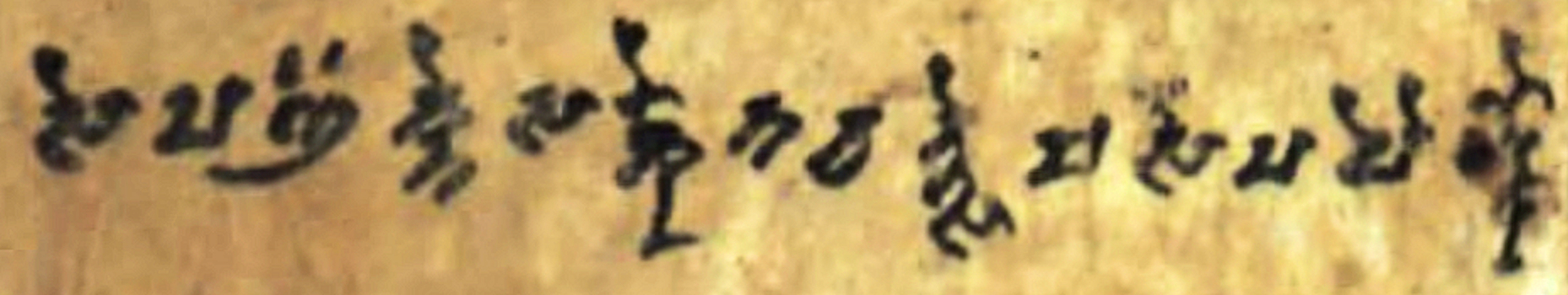
- Kizil Caves standing Buddha. Often attributed in the past to the 7th century AD, but now carbon dated to AD 245-340. Tocharian B inscription reading: Se pañäkte saṅketavattse ṣarsa papaiykau "This Buddha was painted by the hand of Sanketava".
- Script type: Abugida
- Period: 8th century
- Languages: Tocharian languages

Related scripts
- Parent systems: Egyptian: Proto-Sinaitic; Phoenician; Aramaic; Brahmi; Tocharian script
- Sister systems: Gupta, Tamil-Brahmi, Bhattiprolu, Sinhala

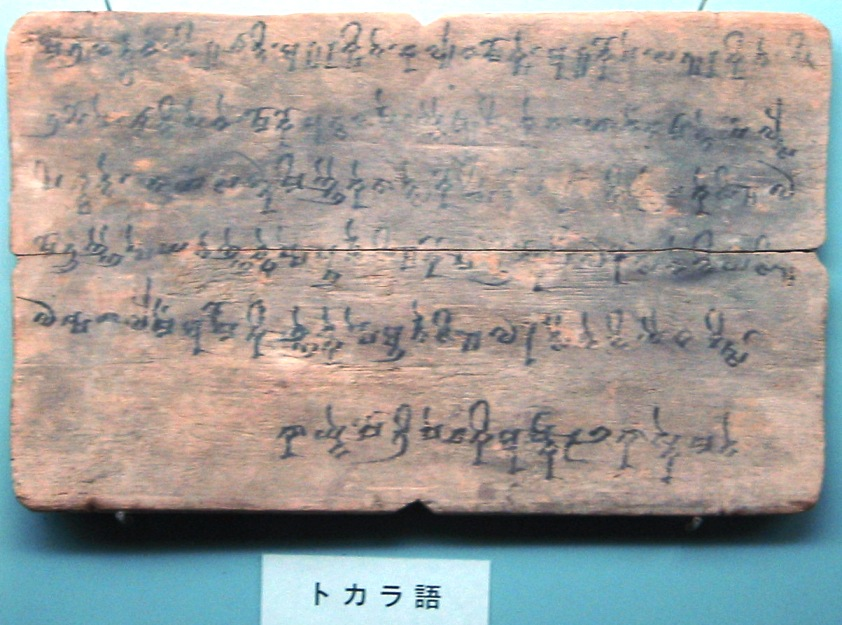
Sample of Tocharian script on a tablet.

The Tocharian script, also known as Central Asian slanting Gupta script or North Turkestan Brāhmī, is an abugida which uses a system of diacritical marks to associate vowels with consonant symbols. Part of the Brahmic scripts, it is a version of the Indian Brahmi script. It is used to write the Central Asian Indo-European Tocharian languages, mostly from the 8th century (with a few earlier ones, probably as early as AD 300) that were written on palm leaves, wooden tablets and Chinese paper, preserved by the extremely dry climate of the Tarim Basin. Samples of the language have been discovered at sites in Kucha and Karasahr, including many mural inscriptions. Mistakenly identifying the speakers of this language with the Tokharoi people of Tokharistan (the Bactria of the Greeks), early authors called these languages "Tocharian". This naming has remained, although the names Agnean and Kuchean have been proposed as a replacement.

Tocharian A and B are not mutually intelligible. Properly speaking, based on the tentative interpretation of twqry as related to Tokharoi, only Tocharian A may be referred to as Tocharian, while Tocharian B could be called Kuchean (its native name may have been kuśiññe), but since their grammars are usually treated together in scholarly works, the terms A and B have proven useful. A common Proto-Tocharian language must precede the attested languages by several centuries, probably dating to the 1st millennium BC. Given the small geographical range of and the lack of secular texts in Tocharian A, it might alternatively have been a liturgical language, the relationship between the two being similar to that between Classical Chinese and Mandarin. However, the lack of a secular corpus in Tocharian A is by no means definite, due to the fragmentary preservation of Tocharian texts in general.

== History ==
The Tocharian script is derived from the Brahmi alphabetic syllabary (abugida) and is referred to as slanting Brahmi. It soon became apparent that a large proportion of the manuscripts were translations of known Buddhist works in Sanskrit and some of them were even bilingual, facilitating decipherment of the new language. Besides the Buddhist and Manichaean religious texts, there were also monastery correspondence and accounts, commercial documents, caravan permits, and medical and magical texts, and one love poem. Many Tocharians embraced Manichaean duality or Buddhism.

In 1998, Chinese linguist Ji Xianlin published a translation and analysis of fragments of a Tocharian Maitreyasamiti-Nataka discovered in 1974 in Yanqi.

The Tocharian script probably died out after 840, when the Uyghurs were expelled from Mongolia by the Kyrgyz, retreating to the Tarim Basin. This theory is supported by the discovery of translations of Tocharian texts into Uyghur. During Uyghur rule, the peoples assimilated by the Turkic speaking Uyghurs now in Xinjiang.

== Script ==
The Tocharian script is based on Brahmi, with each consonant having an inherent vowel, which can be altered by adding a vowel mark or removed by a special nullifying mark, the virama. Like Brahmi, Tocharian uses stacking for conjunct consonants and has irregular conjunct forms of, ra. Unlike other Brahmi scripts, Tocharian has a second set of characters called Fremdzeichen that double up several of the standard consonants, but with an inherent "Ä" vowel. The eleven Fremdzeichen are most often found as substitutes for the standard consonant+virama in conjuncts, but they can be found in any context other than with the explicit "Ä" vowel mark. Fremdzeichen as consonant+virama is not found in later Tocharian texts.

=== Table of Tocharian letters ===
Tocharian vowels
Independent	A	Ā	I	Ī	U	Ū
R̥	R̥̄	E	Ai	O	Au	Ä
Vowel diacritics (here applied on as an example)	Tha	Thā	Thi	Thī	Thu	Thū
Thr̥	Thr̥̄	The	Thai	Tho	Thau	Thä

Tocharian consonants
Velars	Ka	Kha	Ga	Gha	Ṅa
Standard					
Fremdzeichen					
Palatals	Ca	Cha	Ja	Jha	Ña
Retroflexes	Ṭa	Ṭha	Ḍa	Ḍha	Ṇa
Dentals	Ta	Tha	Da	Dha	Na
Standard					
Fremdzeichen					
Labials	Pa	Pha	Ba	Bha	Ma
Standard					
Fremdzeichen					
Sonorants	Ya	Ra	La	Va	
Standard					
Fremdzeichen					
Sibilants	Śa	Ṣa	Sa	Ha	
Standard					
Fremdzeichen					

Other marks
Visarga	Anusvara	Virama (on)	Jihvamuliya	Upadhmaniya

=== Evolution from Brahmi to Tocharian ===
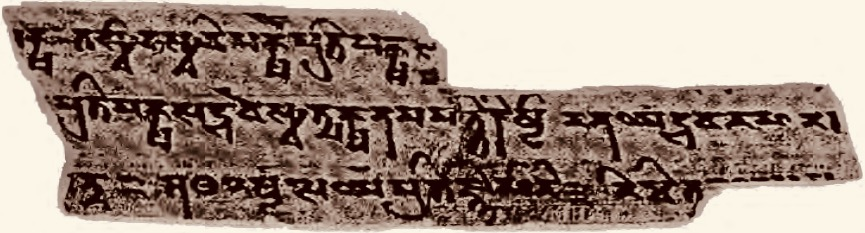
2nd-century CE Sanskrit, Kizil Caves. First line: "... [pa]kasah tasmad asma(d)vipaksapratipaksas..." . Spitzer, Manuscript folio 383 fragment.

Manuscripts in Sanskrit, using Middle Brahmi script and the Kushan period, and carbon dated to the 2nd century CE, have been discovered in the Tarim Basin, and particularly at Kizil. Some of the fragments, quite possibly the oldest Sanskrit manuscript of any type related to Buddhism and Hinduism discovered so far, were discovered in 1906 in the form of a pile of more than 1,000 palm leaf fragments in the Ming-oi, Kizil Caves, during the third Turfan expedition headed by Albert Grünwedel. The calibrated age of the manuscript by Carbon-14 technique is 130 CE (80–230 CE), corresponding to the rule of the Kushan king Kanishka.

The Tocharian script evolved from the Middle Brahmi script of the Kushan Empire:

Evolution from Early Brahmi to Middle Brahmi, and to Tocharian
	a	i	u	e	o	k-	kh-	g-	gh-	ṅ-	c-	ch-	j-	jh-	ñ-	ṭ-	ṭh-	ḍ-	ḍh-
Early Brahmi	𑀅	𑀇	𑀉	𑀏	𑀑	𑀓	𑀔	𑀕	𑀖	𑀗	𑀘	𑀙	𑀚	𑀛	𑀜	𑀝	𑀞	𑀟	𑀠
Middle Brahmi																			
Tocharian																			

	ṇ-	t-	th-	d-	dh-	n-	p-	ph-	b-	bh-	m-	y-	r-	l-	v-	ś-	ṣ-	s-	h-
Early Brahmi	𑀡	𑀢	𑀣	𑀤	𑀥	𑀦	𑀧	𑀨	𑀩	𑀪	𑀫	𑀬	𑀭	𑀮	𑀯	𑀰	𑀱	𑀲	𑀳
Middle Brahmi																			
Tocharian																			

== Unicode ==
Tocharian script was proposed for inclusion in Unicode in 2015 but has not been approved.
