= Maitreyasamitināṭaka =

8th-century Buddhist drama

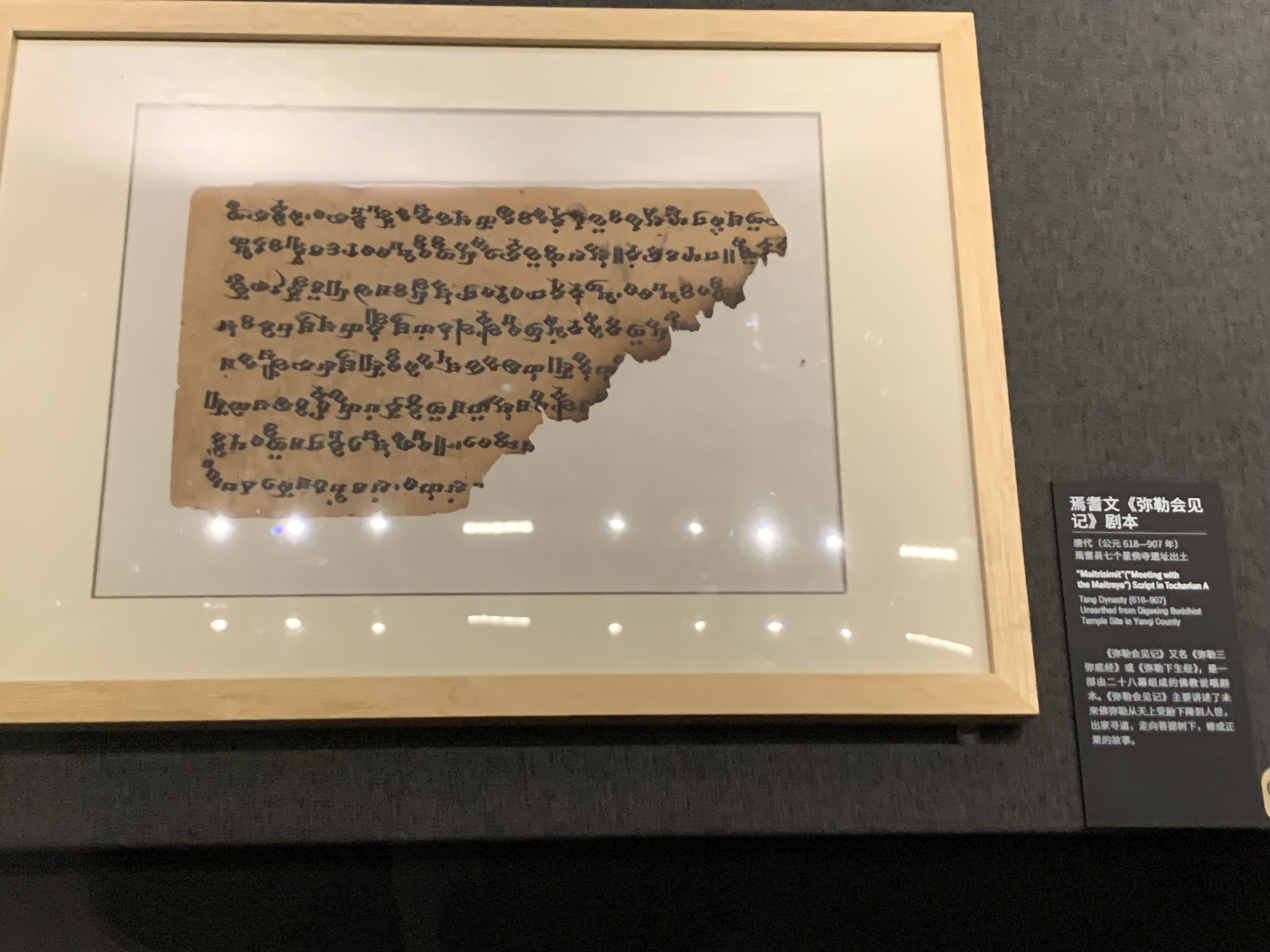
Tocharian fragment

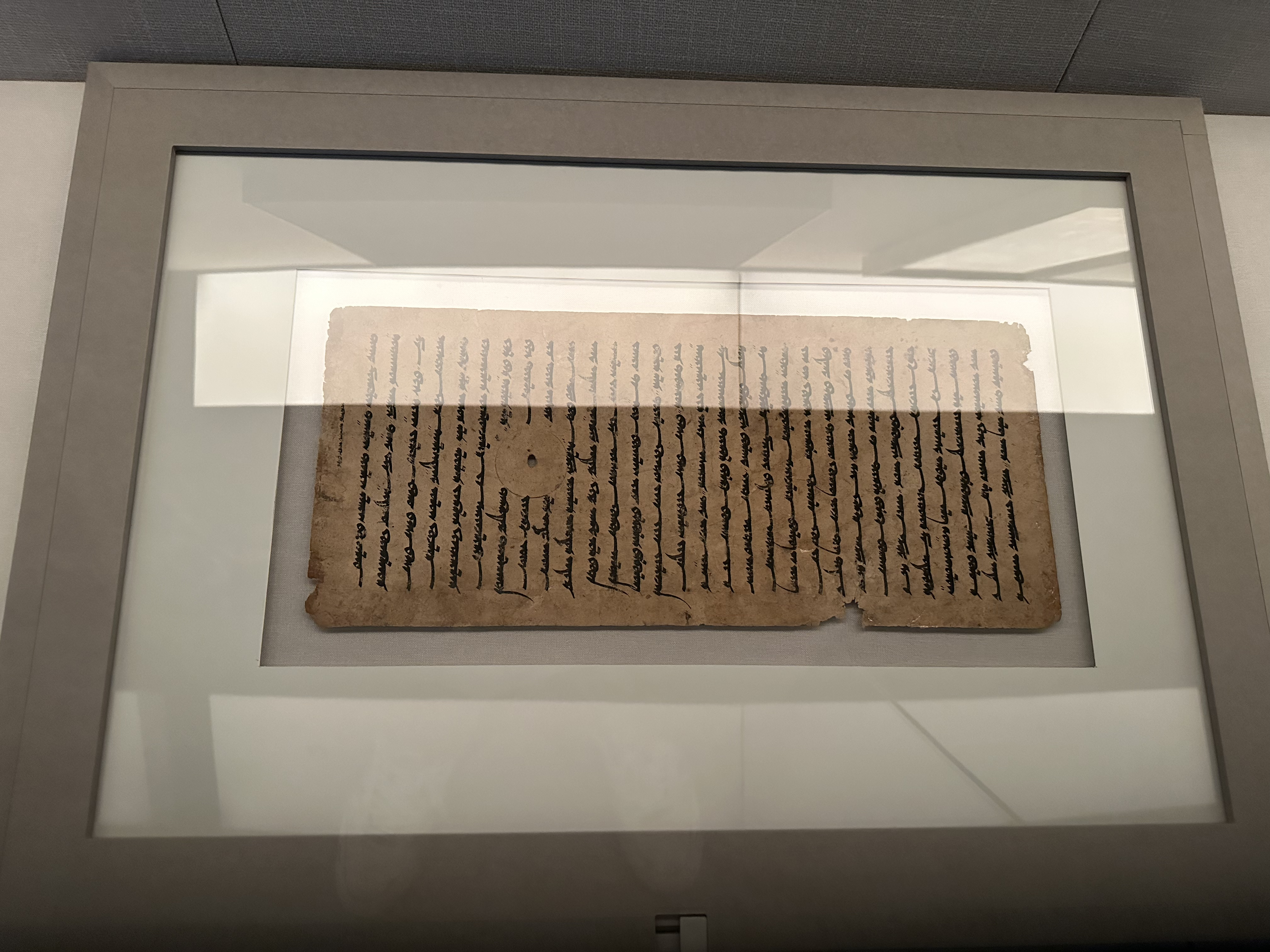
Uyghur fragment

Maitreyasamitināṭaka is a Buddhist drama in the language known as Tocharian A. It dates to the eighth century and survives only in fragments. The drama revolves around the Buddha Maitreya, the future saviour of the world. This story was popular among Buddhists and parallel versions can be found in Chinese, Tibetan, Khotanese, Sogdian, Pali and Sanskrit. According to Friedrich W. K. Müller and Emil Sieg, the apparent meaning of the title is "Encounter with Maitreya".

There is an Old Uyghur translation of the Tocharian text, called Maitrisimit nom bitig. It is a much more complete text and has been dated to between the eighth and eleventh centuries. The fragments of the Tocharian text come from six different manuscripts, five from the Shikshin Temple and one from Qocho. Albert Grünwedel and Albert von Le Coq discovered the Tocharian text during the third German Turfan expedition in 1906, when the Tocharian languages had been extinct for more than a millennium and were unknown to modern linguists. The Old Uyghur text is represented by four manuscripts, two from Turfan, one from Qomul dated 1067 and one of uncertain provenance in the collection of Ōtani Kōzui.

A colophon to the Uyghur text notes that it was translated from a language called toxrï. Under the assumption that this name was connected to a Central Asian people known as the Tocharoi in ancient Greek texts, and since the Maitrisimit nom bitig shows a "clear dependence" on the Maitreyasamitināṭaka, scholars began to refer to the unidentified language of the latter as "Tocharian". According to the colophon, the Tocharian version was "compiled" or "put together" by Āryacandra from source texts in Indian languages, while the Uyghur translation was the work of Prajñārakṣita.

The Maitreyasamitināṭaka was originally a long text consisting of twenty-seven acts of ten to fifteen leaves (twenty to thirty pages) each. The Tocharian fragments come from manuscripts of high aesthetic value, indicating a text that was meant to be read. There are stage directions, however, such as lcär poñś ("all have left [the scene]") at the end of each act, which suggests that it was also performed. It is in the champu style with sections of prose mixed with sections of verse. The Maitrisimit translation is all prose.

== Notes ==
=== Bibliography ===
- Elverskog, Johan. 1997. Uygur Buddhist Literature. Brepols.
- Kasai, Yukiyo. 2023. "Manichaeism and Buddhism in Contact: The Significance of the Uyghur History and Its Literary Tradition". Entangled Religions, 14(2).
- Kumamoto, Hiroshi. 2009. "The Maitreya-samiti and Khotanese" Archived 2019-10-28 at the Wayback Machine. Academia.edu. [Based on a paper read at the Symposium franco-japonais : «Interactions et translations culturelles en Eurasie» («Dynamic Interactions of Cultures in Eurasia»), jointly held by the University of Tokyo and École Pratique des Hautes Études in Paris on 12–13 December 2002.]
- Laut, Jens Peter. 2013. "Hells in Central Asian Turkic Buddhism and Early Turkic Islam". Antonio Fabris (ed.), Tra quattro paradisi. Esperienze, ideologie e riti relativi alla morte. Edizioni Ca'Foscari. pp. 16–37.
- Moerloose, Eddy. 1979. "The Way of Vision (Darśanamārga) in the Tocharian and Old Turkish Versions of the Maitreyasamitināṭaka". Central Asiatic Journal, 23(3): 240–249. JSTOR 41927265
- Peyrot, Michaël; Semet, Ablet. 2016. "A Comparative Study of the Beginning of the 11th Act of the Tocharian A Maitreyasamitināṭaka and the Old Uyghur Maitrisimit". Acta Orientalia Academiae Scientiarum Hungaricae, 69(4): 355–378. doi:10.1556/062.2016.69.4.1
- Ji Xianlin (ed.). 1998. Fragments of the Tocharian A Maitreyasamiti-Nätaka of the Xinjiang Museum, China. Trends in Linguistics. Studies and Monographs, 113. Berlin–New York: Mouton de Gruyter.
- Zieme, Peter. 2000. "The Search for Knowledge Through Translation: Translations of Manichaean, Christian and Buddhist Literature into Chinese, Turkic, Mongolian, Tibetan and Other Languages". C. E. Bosworth and M. S. Asimov (eds.), History of Civilizations of Central Asia, Volume IV: The Age of Achievement, A.D. 750 to the End of the Fifteenth Century, Part II: The Achievements. UNESCO Publishing. pp. 43–51.
