= Friedrich W. K. Müller =

German scholar and orientalist (1863–1930)

- Born: January 21, 1863; Neudamm
- Died: April 18, 1930 (aged 67); Berlin
- Occupation: Orientalist

Friedrich W. K. Müller (January 21, 1863 in Neudamm – April 18, 1930 in Berlin) was a German scholar of oriental cultures and languages. He is best remembered for his decipherment of manuscript fragments collected on the German Turfan expeditions to western China.

From 1883 he studied theology and oriental languages at the University of Berlin, where his influences included Eduard Sachau and Wilhelm Grube. In 1887 he began work at the Ethnological Museum of Berlin under Adolf Bastian. In 1896 he was appointed a directorial assistant in the museum's East Asian department, becoming its director in 1906. Except for a research trip to the Far East (China, Korea, Japan) in 1901, he remained at the museum until his retirement in 1928.

== Selected works ==
- Handschriften-Reste in Estrangelo-Schrift aus Turfan, Chinesisch-Turkistan II (as editor), 1904 – Manuscript fragments in Estrangelo script from the Turfan expedition.
- Uigurica, 1908.
- Soghdische Texte I, 1913 – Sogdian text I.
- Zwei Pfahlinschriften aus den Turfanfunden, 1915 – Inscriptions from the Turfan discoveries.
  - 1. Die uigurische Inschrift auf dem Pfahle – Uighur inscriptions.
  - 2. Die chinesische Pfahlinschrift – Chinese inscriptions.
- Soghdische Texte II, 1934 – Sogdian text II.

== Peers ==
- Albert von Le Coq
- Vilhelm Thomsen
- Emil Sieg
- Friedrich Carl Andreas
