= List of Tocharian (Agnean-Kuchean) peoples =

This is a list of the peoples that are called Tocharians (although now generally considered a misnomer for them), also known by the name Agnean-Kuchean, a now extinct Indo-European group of peoples who were speakers of Tocharian, a distinct Indo-European branch of languages. They inhabited the Tarim Basin (occupied in most part by the Taklamakan Desert) in modern-day Xinjiang Chinese Province, in western China. At the end of the first Millennium AD they were assimilated by the Turkic Uyghur people and lost their distinct ethnic identity.

Several scholars such as J. P. Mallory and Victor H. Mair argue that they were descendants of the Afanasievo culture people, who possibly were speakers of an Indo-European language or languages and that, in a still undetermined time, migrated south towards the Tarim Basin and settled mainly on the northern and eastern edges, and also on some southern edges (north, east and south of the Taklamakan Desert).

== Ancestors ==
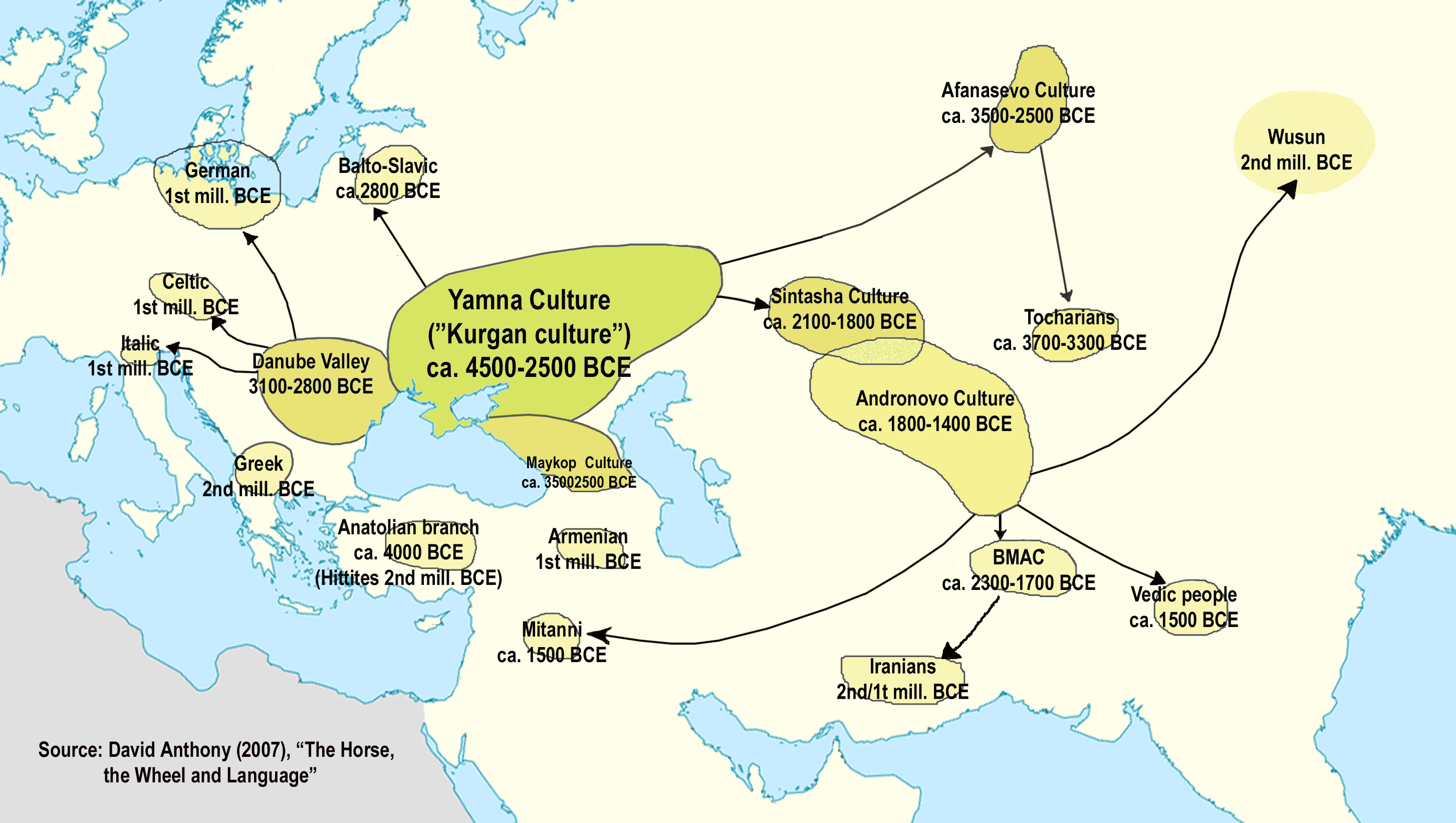
Map 1: Indo-European migrations as described in The Horse, the Wheel, and Language by David W. Anthony

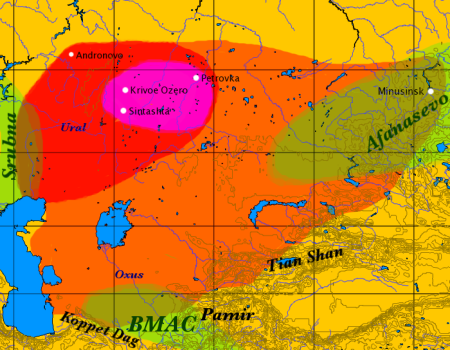
Map 2: Sintashta-Petrovka culture (red), its expansion into the Andronovo culture (orange) during the 2nd millennium BC, showing the overlap with the Bactria–Margiana Archaeological Complex (chartreuse green) in the south and also with the Afanasievo culture in the east. The location of the earliest chariots is shown in magenta. Several scholars associate Proto-Tocharians with Afanasievo culture.

Map 3: Tocharian languages A (blue), B (red) and C (green) spoken by the Tocharian peoples in the Tarim Basin. Tarim oasis towns are given as listed in the Book of Han (c. 2nd century BC). The areas of the squares are proportional to population.

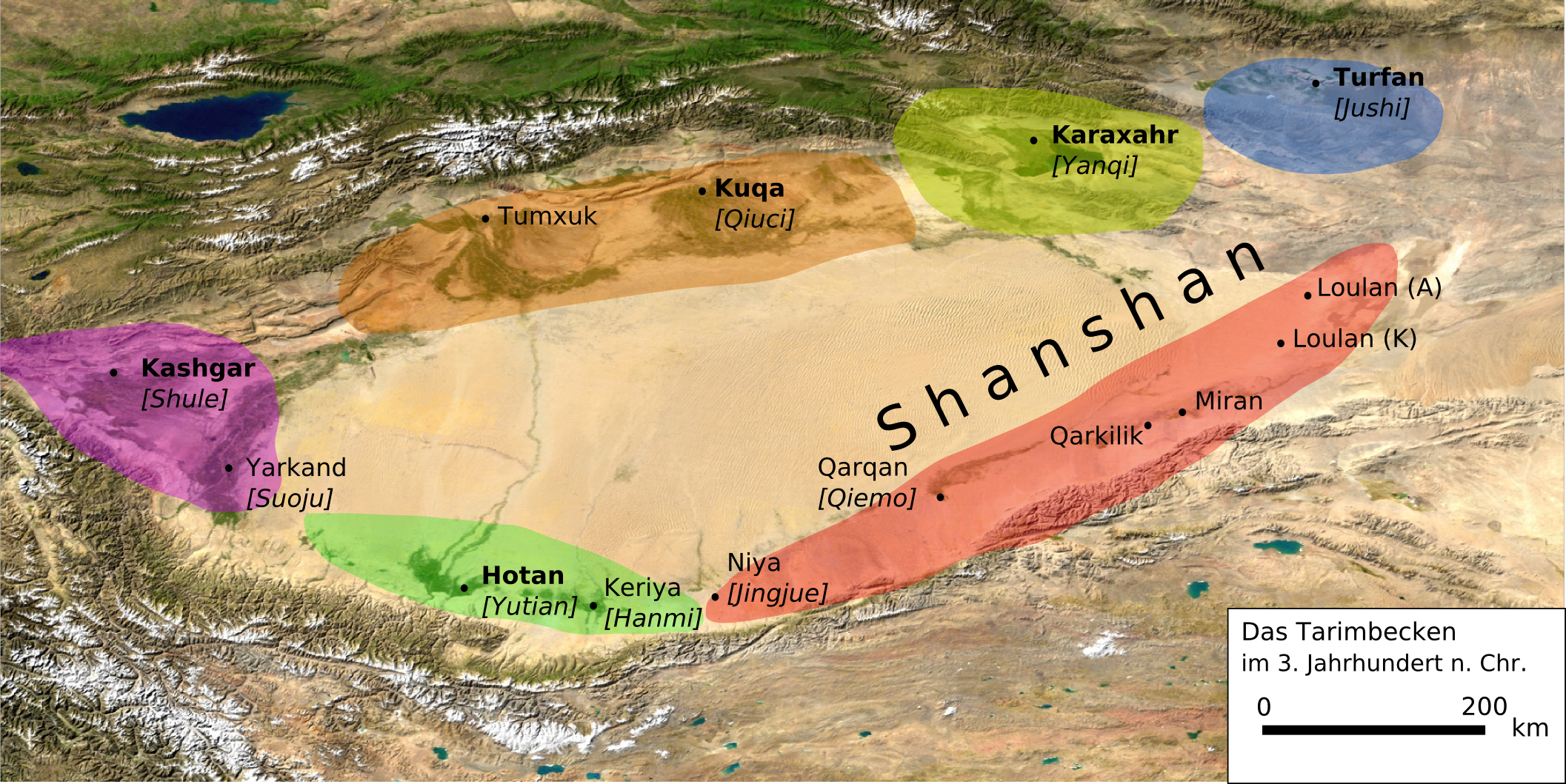
Map 4: Tarim Basin in the 3rd century showing the kingdoms.

- Proto-Indo-Europeans (Proto-Indo-European speakers)
  - Proto-Tocharians (Afanasievo culture people?) (Proto-Tocharian speakers)

== Eastern Tocharians ==
They were possible speakers of Tocharian A, but also may have spoken Tocharian B because the two languages overlapped. There is the possibility that Tocharian B replaced Tocharian A.

- Agneans / Arseans (Ārśiññe) / Aspacares (mentioned by Ptolemy based on an Iranian exonym) - in Agni Oasis, (Ārśi may have been the native name) (i.e. Chinese Yanqi; modern Karasahr) (According to Douglas Q. Adams the name Ārśiññe was not the native name for the Agneans as the name Ārśi was not a designation for Tocharian A as has occasionally been supposed or for modern Karasahr Oasis; it meant "ordained beggar monk" as a noun and "Aryan" - Iranian or Indo-Aryan, as an adjective, it was a borrowing from Prakrit through some Iranian language. However, this explanation is contested by Zhivko Voynikov who states that the name Ārśi meant "Bright" or "White", and was the ancient name for modern Karasahr Oasis and was also the basis of a real self ethnonym for the people of this region).
- Gushi or Jushi or Gushineans (Turpan Tocharians) - an obscure ancient people that lived in the Turpan Basin, i.e. Chinese Jushi or Gushi, including Qocho, known in Chinese as Gaochang they were the basis of the Gushi or Jushi Kingdom. They spoke a language that eventually diverged into two dialects, as noted by diplomats from the Han empire.
  - Nearer Gushi / Anterior Gushi, in the southern Turpan Basin
  - Further Gushi / Posterior Gushi, in the northern Turpan Basin
- Other possible Eastern Tocharian peoples mentioned by Antiquity authors
  - Asmires (mentioned by Ptolemy and Ammianus Marcellinus as living in Serica, possibly in today's Xinjiang, in far western China)
  - Garinei / Garineies / Gierones (mentioned by Ptolemy and Ammianus Marcellinus as living in Serica, possibly in today's Xinjiang, in far western China)
  - Thagures / Phagures / Aphagures / Phagurians (south of Bogda Shan, between Turpan and Hami), possibly the Gushi / Jushi were part of this larger population (mentioned by Ptolemy and Ammianus Marcellinus as living in Serica, possibly in today's Xinjiang, in far western China) (some scholars identify them with the Yuezhi)

== Western Tocharians ==
They were possible speakers of Tocharian B, possibly they were not speakers of Tocharian A because the two languages did not overlap in that area.

- Kucheans (Kuśiññe) / Damnes – in Kuśi or Kucaññe or Kuca / Kucha (native name) Oasis, also known as Kuchi / Kucha, in modern Kuche County and in modern Aksu Prefecture and Tumxuk) (the native name Kuśi is similar to Gushi – modern Turpan) (they were the basis for the Kucha Kingdom)
- Other possible Western Tocharian peoples mentioned by Antiquity authors
  - Oichardes [Wujie] (along the Oicharda river banks, modern Tarim river) (mentioned by Ptolemy and Ammianus Marcellinus as living in Serica, possibly in today's Xinjiang, in far western China)
  - Piades (between Bügür / Luntai and Korla / Yuli) (mentioned by Ptolemy and Ammianus Marcellinus as living in Serica, possibly in today's Xinjiang, in far western China)
  - Rabanes / Rabaneis (Loufan)? (area east of Jiuli in the western part of Kuruktag and south of Bosten Lake) (mentioned by Ptolemy and Ammianus Marcellinus as living in Serica, possibly in today's Xinjiang, in far western China)
  - Siziges – in Bharuka / Baluka (native name), modern Aksu, Aksu Prefecture, Onsu, and Tumshuq (mentioned by Ptolemy and Ammianus Marcellinus as living in Serica, possibly in today's Xinjiang, in far western China)

== Hypothetical Tocharian peoples ==
=== Southern Tocharians ===
They were possible speakers of Tocharian C, a substrate language to the later written Prakrit Indo-Aryan languages on the southeast edge of the Tarim Basin and possibly in its southern part also.

- Krorainians-Tsadotians / Chauranes (possibly an originally Tocharian people, later Scythianized and mixed with Scythians or Sakas migrants and conquerors they shifted their ethnic and linguistic identity and formed the Chauranes Scythians or Kroraina Sakas) - in Krorän or Kroraina (native name), Loulan in Chinese, [Navapa – Nava Apa – “New Water” in Sogdian], Andir, Miran, Qarkilik, Qarqan – Qiemo and in Caḍ́ota [Tsaḍ́ota] now known as Niya by the Uyghurs and Jingjue by the Han Chinese) (in Loulan and Shanshan).
- Hatties Tocharians / Khotan Tocharians (possibly an originally Tocharian people, later Scythianized and mixed with Scythians or Sakas migrants and conquerors they shifted their ethnic and linguistic identity and formed the Hatties Scythians or Khotan Sakas) (also called "Ottorocares", this name derives from Sanskrit Uttarakuru - "Uttara Kuru" - "Northern Tribes", from an Indian point of view) - in Khotan and Khotan County

=== Western Tocharians ===
- Abies (possibly an originally Tocharian people, later Scythianized and mixed with Scythians or Sakas migrants and conquerors they shifted their ethnic and linguistic identity and formed the Abies Scythians or Abies Sakas) (also called "Ottorocares", this name derives from Sanskrit Uttarakuru - "Uttara Kuru" - "Northern Tribes", from an Indian point of view) - in modern Yarkant / Shache, Yarkant County
- Anibes (possibly an originally Tocharian people, later Scythianized and mixed with Scythians or Sakas migrants and conquerors they shifted their ethnic and linguistic identity and formed the Anibes Scythians or Anibes Sakas or Tumshuq Sakas, Tumshuqese speakers) - in Kasia region, modern Kashgar / Kāshígá'ěr, Shule County and Tumshuq.

== Possible Tocharian peoples ==
=== Tocharian or Iranian ===
There are different or conflicting views among scholars regarding the ethnic and linguistic kinship of the peoples known by the Han Chinese as Wusun and Yuezhi and also other less known peoples (a minority of scholars argue that they were Tocharians, based, among other things, on the similarity of names like "Kushan" and the native name of "Kucha" (Kuśi) and the native name "Kuśi" and Chinese name "Gushi" or the name "Arsi" and "Asii", however most scholars argue that they were possibly Northeastern Iranian peoples)

- Argipaei
- Asii / Asianes / Essedones / Issedones / Wusun (may have been the same people called by different exonym names)
  - Asii / Asioi / Osii, an ancient Indo-European people of Central Asia, during the 2nd and 1st Centuries BCE, known only from Classical Greek and Roman sources.
  - Asianes
  - Essedones
  - Issedones, people that lived north and northeast of the Sarmatians and Scythians in Western Siberia or Chinese Turkestan (Xinjiang), specifically in modern Dzungaria (may have been the same people as the Asii or Asioi).
  - Wusun - some speculate that they were the same as the Issedones / Essedones
- Throanes / Phroanes / Tures / Turans / Turanians (mentioned by Ptolemy and Ammianus Marcellinus as living in a northern land, possibly they lived in today's Altai and Sayan mountains, Tuva and western part of Mongolia) (preceded the Turkic and Mongolic peoples in the same territory)
- Yuezhi / Gara? (an ancient Indo-European speaking people, in the western areas of the modern Chinese province of Gansu, during the 1st millennium BC, or in Dunhong, in the Tian Shan, later they migrated westward and southward into south Central Asia, in contact and conflict with the Sogdians and Bactrians, and they possibly were the people called by the name Tocharians or Tukhara, which was possibly an Iranian speaking people not to be confused with another people misnamed or not as "Tocharians") (according to the Iranian historian Jahanshah Derakhshani the Kochi or Kuchi people, a group of nomadic Ghilji or Ghilzai Pakhtun, are descendants from the Yuezhi that were assimilated into the Pakhtun, the name derives from Guci, formerly Chinese: 月氏; pinyin: Yuèzhī) (mentioned by Ptolemy and Ammianus Marcellinus as living in Serica, possibly in today's Xinjiang, in far western China)
  - Greater-Yuezhi (Tu Gara?) (Dà Yuèzhī – 大月氏) (Tu Gara > Tu Kara? > Tu Khara?) Possibly the Iranian Tocharians (not to be confused with the peoples called "Tocharians" in a misnomer) (possibly they were the ancestors of the Kushans)
    - Tusharas (Tukharas?), could have been identical with the Greater-Yuezhi, the greater part of Yuezhi, the people that migrated from western Gansu and after from the Ili Valley, migrated southward and settled in Tukhara, another name for Bactria after the invasion of the Iranian Tocharians that came from the north and northeast (not to be confused with the peoples mistakenly called "Tocharians" which were of another Indo-European branch of peoples)
      - Kushans (Chinese: 貴霜; pinyin: Guìshuāng), they were the basis of the Kushan Empire)
  - Lesser-Yuezhi (Xiǎo Yuèzhī – 小月氏)

==== Tocharian, Iranian or Turkic ====
- Ordos culture people (in the Upper or North Ordos Plateau or the Ordos Desert) (if ancient Indo-European, they would have been the easternmost people, they may have been a people closely related to the Yuezhi or part of them)

== See also ==
- Tocharians
- Tarim Mummies
- Bezeklik Thousand Buddha Caves
- Sogdia
- Takhar Province (Afghanistan)

== Bibliography ==
- Mallory, J.P.; Mair, Victor H. (2000). The Tarim Mummies: Ancient China and the Mystery of the Earliest Peoples from the West. London: Thames & Hudson. ISBN 978-0-500-05101-6.
