= Miller's law (linguistics) =

Postnasal deaspiration in Proto-Greek

Miller's law proposes that an aspirated consonant in Proto-Greek became deaspirated after a nasal consonant ending an accented vowel. It was identified by Indo-Europeanist D. Gary Miller.

Examples:

- Greek: ὄμβρος, romanized: ómbros "rain" < PIE *ń̥bʰr-os (cf. Latin: imber, Sanskrit: अभ्र, romanized: abhrá, Armenian: ամպրոպ, romanized: amprop, Tokharian B: iprer)
- Greek: τύμβος, romanized: túmbos "tomb" < PIE *túm-bʰos (cf. Middle Irish: tomm, Armenian: թումբ, romanized: tʻumb)
- Greek: θρόμβος, romanized: thrómbos "clot" < PIE *dʰrón-bʰos (cf. Icelandic: drambr, Latvian: dramblys)
- Greek: θάμβος, romanized: thámbos "amazed" < PIE *dʰḿ̥bʰ-es- (cf. English: dumb)
- Greek: κύμβη, romanized: kúmbē "cup, bowl" < PIE *kúm-bʰeh₂ (cf. Sanskrit: कुम्भ, romanized: kumbʰá)

Counterexamples where, because the accent falls on another syllable or because a laryngeal separates the aspirated consonant from the nasal, the law is not triggered:

- Greek: ὀμφαλός "navel" < PIE *h₃n̥bʰl-ós
- Greek: ὀμφή "voice" < PIE *songʷʰ-éh₂
- Greek: γόμφος "peg" < PIE *ǵónh₂-bʰos (possibly exhibiting the Saussure effect)

== See also ==
- Glossary of sound laws in the Indo-European languages
