= Agni-Kuči =

Agni-Kuči is an alternative name advanced by Bernard Sergent for:

- Tocharians, an ancient people who inhabited the Tarim Basin in Central Asia
- Tocharian languages, two (or perhaps three) Indo-European languages spoken by those people
