= Suvarnapushpa =

- Ruler of the Tocharians, King of Kucha
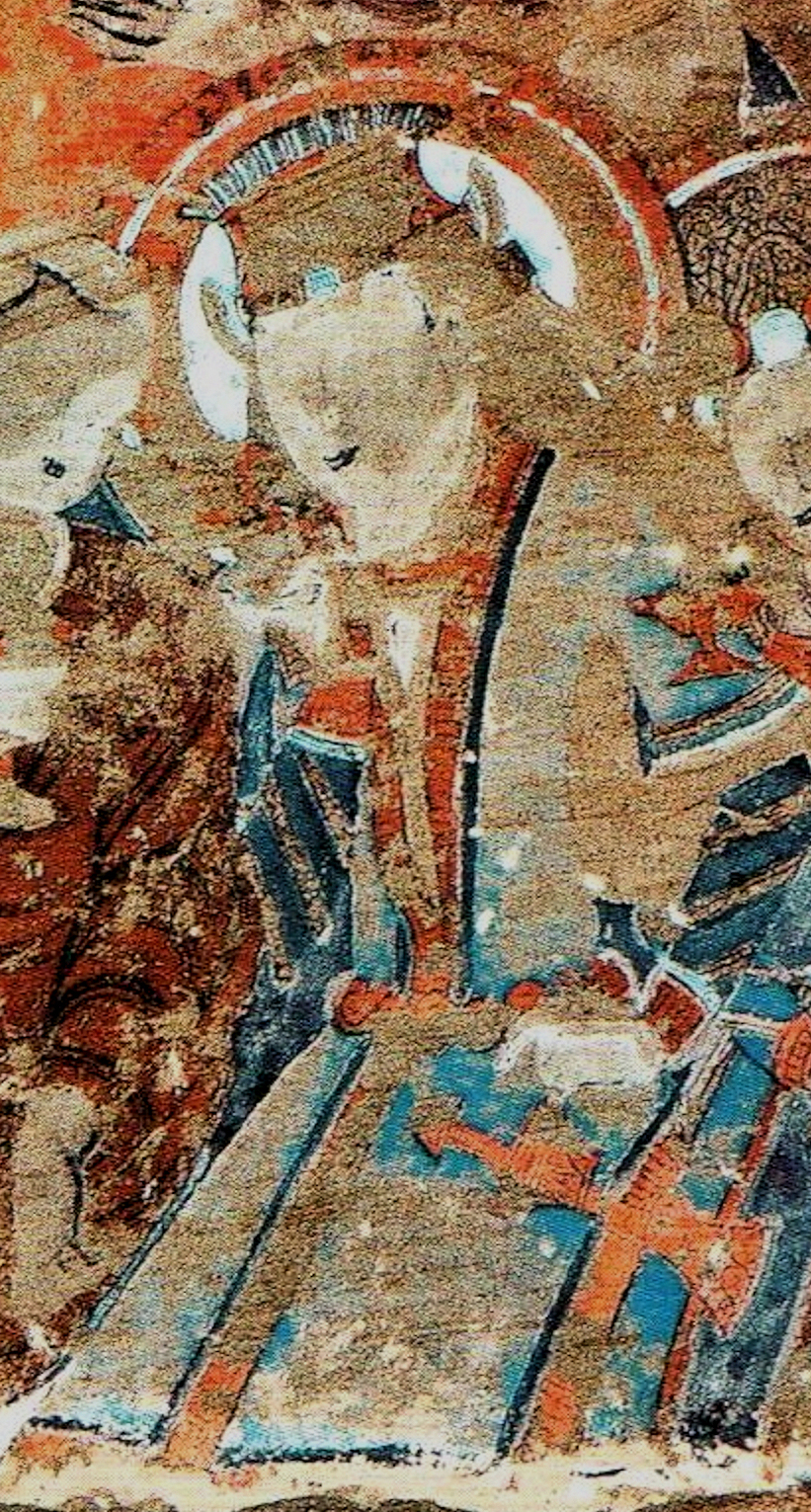
- King Suvarnapusa of Kucha, from Cave 69, Kizil Caves.
- Reign: 600-625
- Predecessor: Sunidie
- Successor: Suvarnadeva

Suvarṇapuṣpa (Sanskrit: 𑀲𑀼𑀯𑀭𑁆𑀡𑀧𑀼𑀱𑁆𑀧, lit. 'Gold Flower', Swarnabūspe in Tocharian, or directly translated as Ysāṣṣa Pyāpyo "Golden Flower") was a King of the Tarim Basin city-state of Kucha from 600 to 625. He was known in Buddhist Hybrid Sanskrit (BHS) as Kucīśvara Suvarṇapuṣpa "Suvarṇapuṣpa, lord of Kucha". He was known in Chinese as Bái Sūfábójué (白蘇伐勃駃, the prefix "白" means "white", possibly pointing to the fair complexion of the Kucheans) as he sent an embassy to the court of the Tang dynasty in 618 CE acknowledging vassalship.

== Epigraphy ==
Suvarṇapuṣpa is illustrated with his Queen in Cave 69 of the Kizil Caves, with an inscription in Brahmi script on his halo:

"Temple Constructed for the Benefit of Suvarnapuspa by His Son"

— Cave 69 inscription.

Suvarṇapuṣpa is known to have ruled between 600 and 625, and his three sons died before 647 CE according to Chinese sources.

== Visit of Xuanzang ==
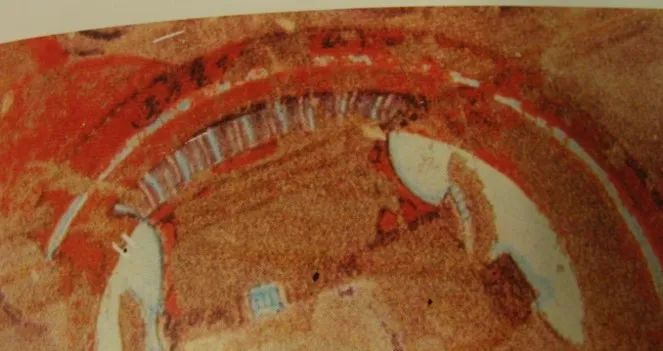
Brahmi script inscription on the halo of Suvarṇapuṣpa (detail).

When he visited Kucha in 630 CE, the Chinese monk Xuanzang received the favours of Suvarna-deva (Chinese: 白蘇伐疊 Bái Sūfádié, ruled 625-645 CE), the son and successor of Suvarna-puspa, and king of Kucha.

Xuanzang described in many details the characteristics of Kucha (屈支国, in "大唐西域记" "Tang Dynasty Account of the Western Regions"), and probably visited Kizil:
1) "The style of writing is Indian, with some differences"
2) "They clothe themselves with ornamental garments of silk and embroidery. They cut their hair and wear a flowing covering (over their heads)"
3) "The king is of Kuchean race"
4) "There are about one hundred convents (saṅghārāmas) in this country, with five thousand and more disciples. These belong to the Little Vehicle of the school of the Sarvāstivādas (Shwo-yih-tsai-yu-po). Their doctrine (teaching of Sūtras) and their rules of discipline (principles of the Vinaya) are like those of India, and those who read them use the same (originals)."
5) "About 40 li to the north of this desert city there are two convents close together on the slope of a mountain".

These events were soon before the Tang campaign against Kucha in 648 CE.

Suvarna-deva is known from an inscription in which he is called in Tocharian "Swarnatepe":

[ika]ṃ ṣe kṣuṃntsa piṅkce [meṃ]ne • [i]

during the 21st year, in the 5th month …
oroccepi lānte swarnatepi kṣ(u)ṃ[n](e)
a3 [r]e [ā]k(ṣ)a •

in the year of the great king Swarnatepe.

Haripuspa was the son and successor of Savarnadeva.

== Cave 69 in Kizil ==
Suvarṇapuṣpa is illustrated with his Queen in Cave 69 of the Kizil Caves, with an inscription in Brahmi script on his halo.

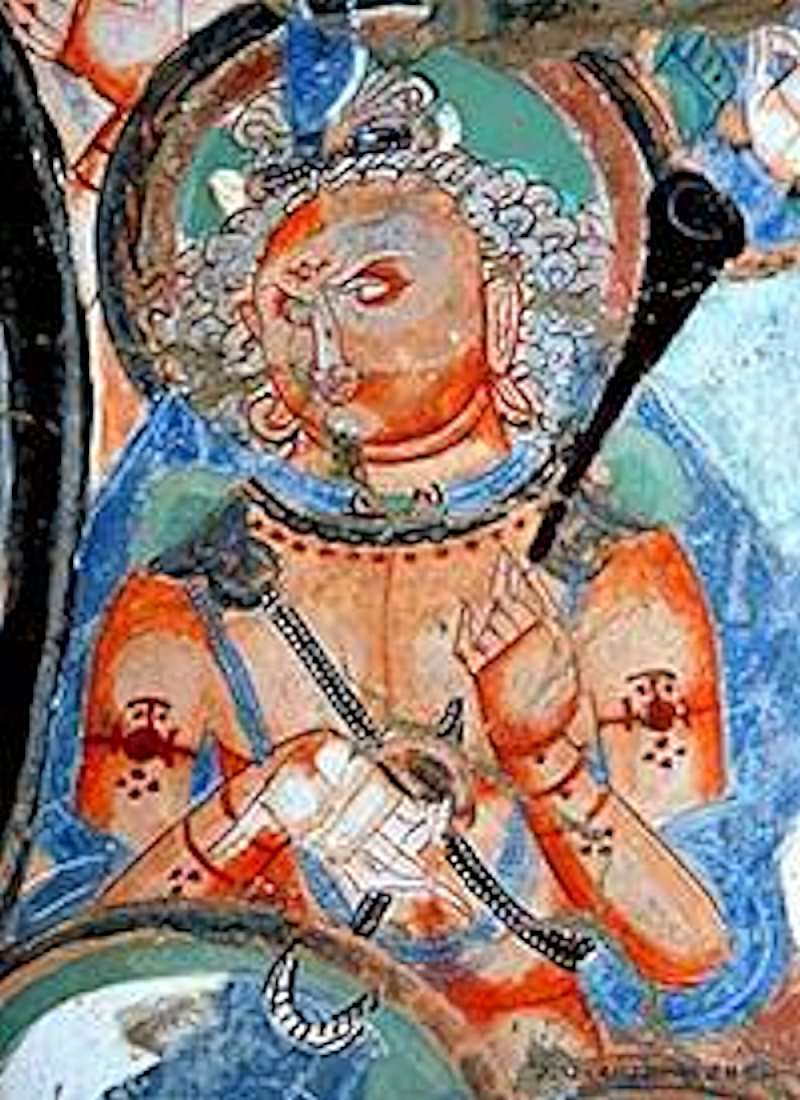
Vajrapani, Cave 69, Kizil

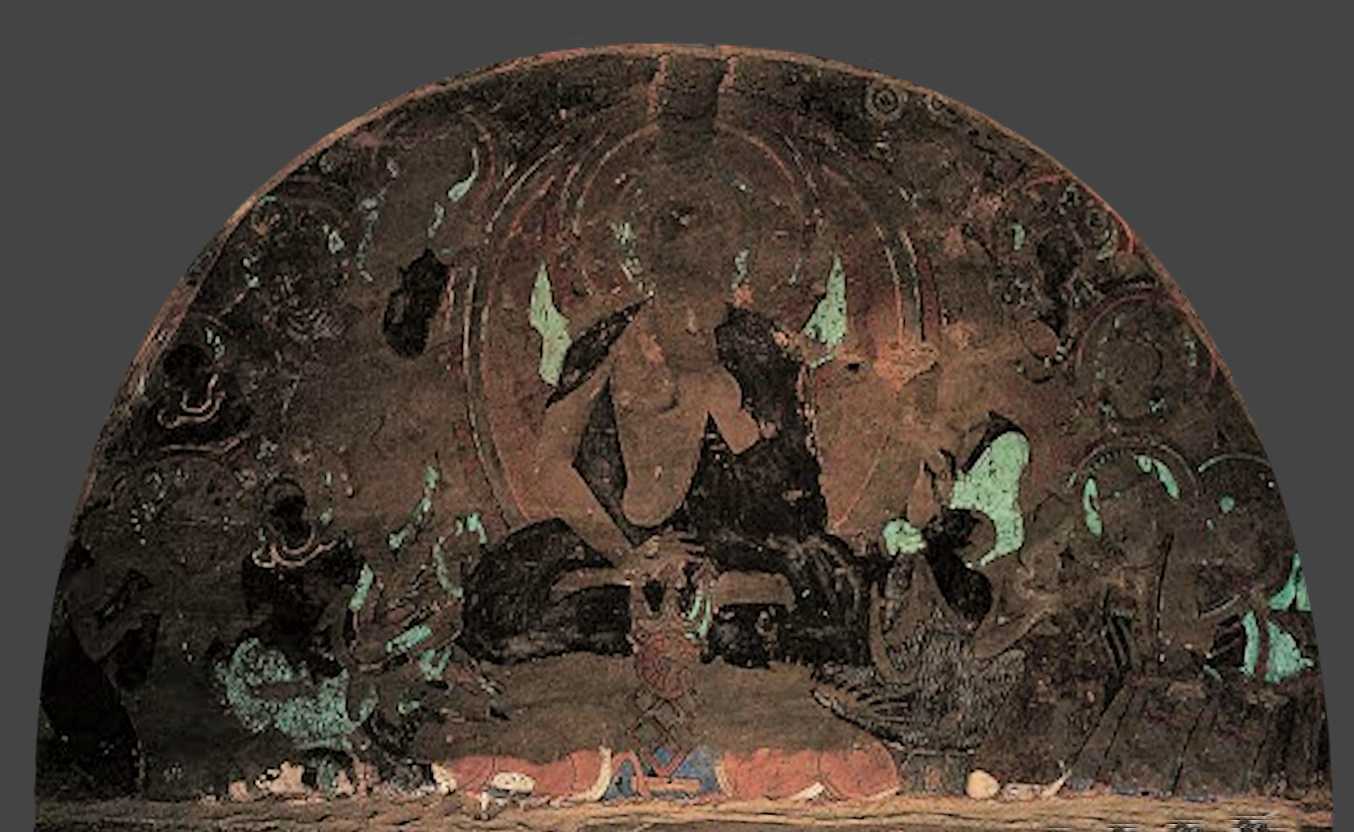
Cave 69, lunette over the front door: the Buddha preaching at Sarnath (佛鹿野苑初转法轮) with King Suvarnapusa and his Queen as attendants.

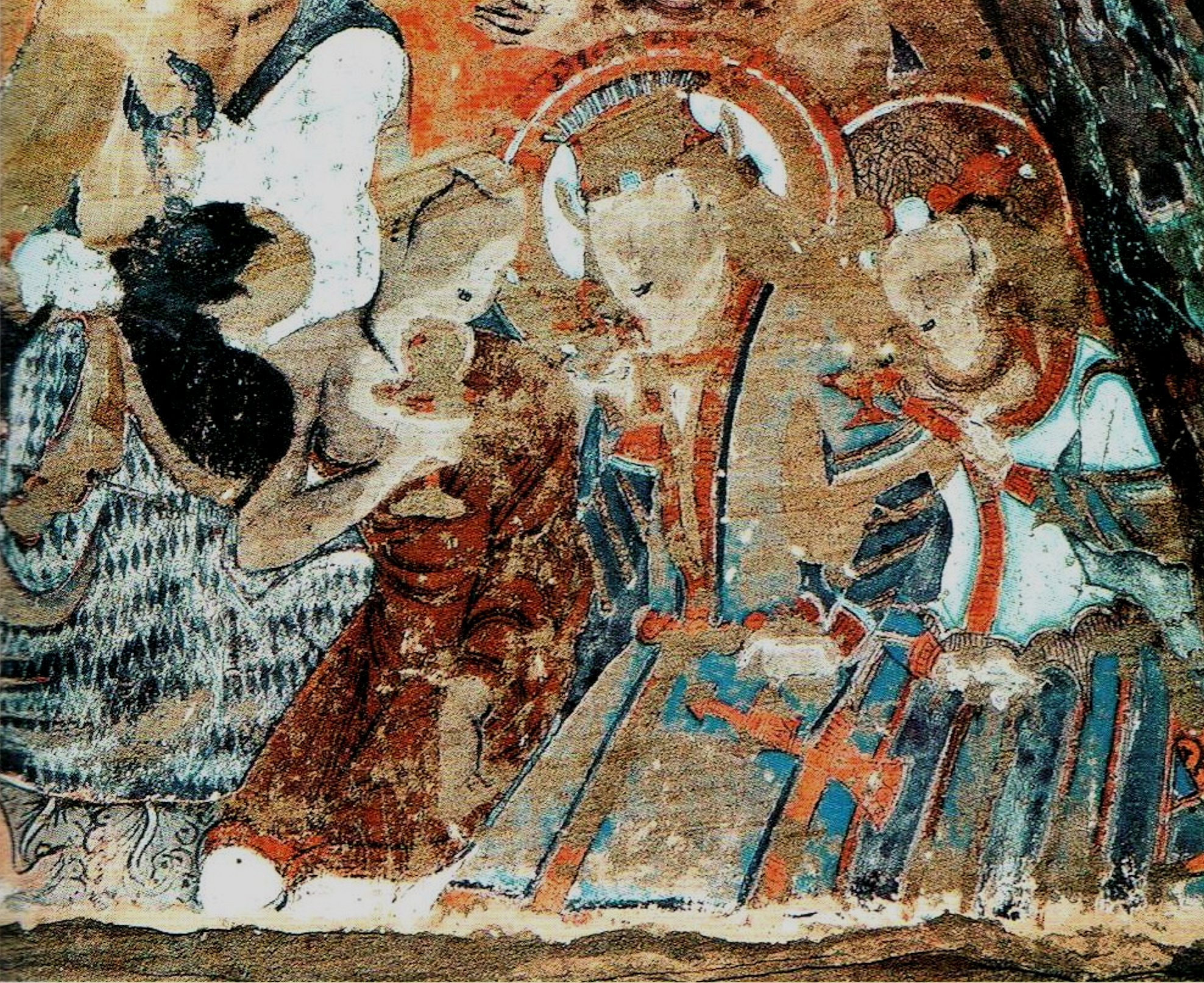
King Suvarnapuspa and his Queen (龟兹国王与王后供养像) in Cave 69 (dated 600-647 CE per Chinese sources).

== Sources ==
- Grousset, René (1970). The Empire of the Steppes: A History of Central Asia. Rutgers University Press. ISBN 978-0-8135-1304-1.
