= Tocharians =

Historical Indo-European ethnic group in present-day China

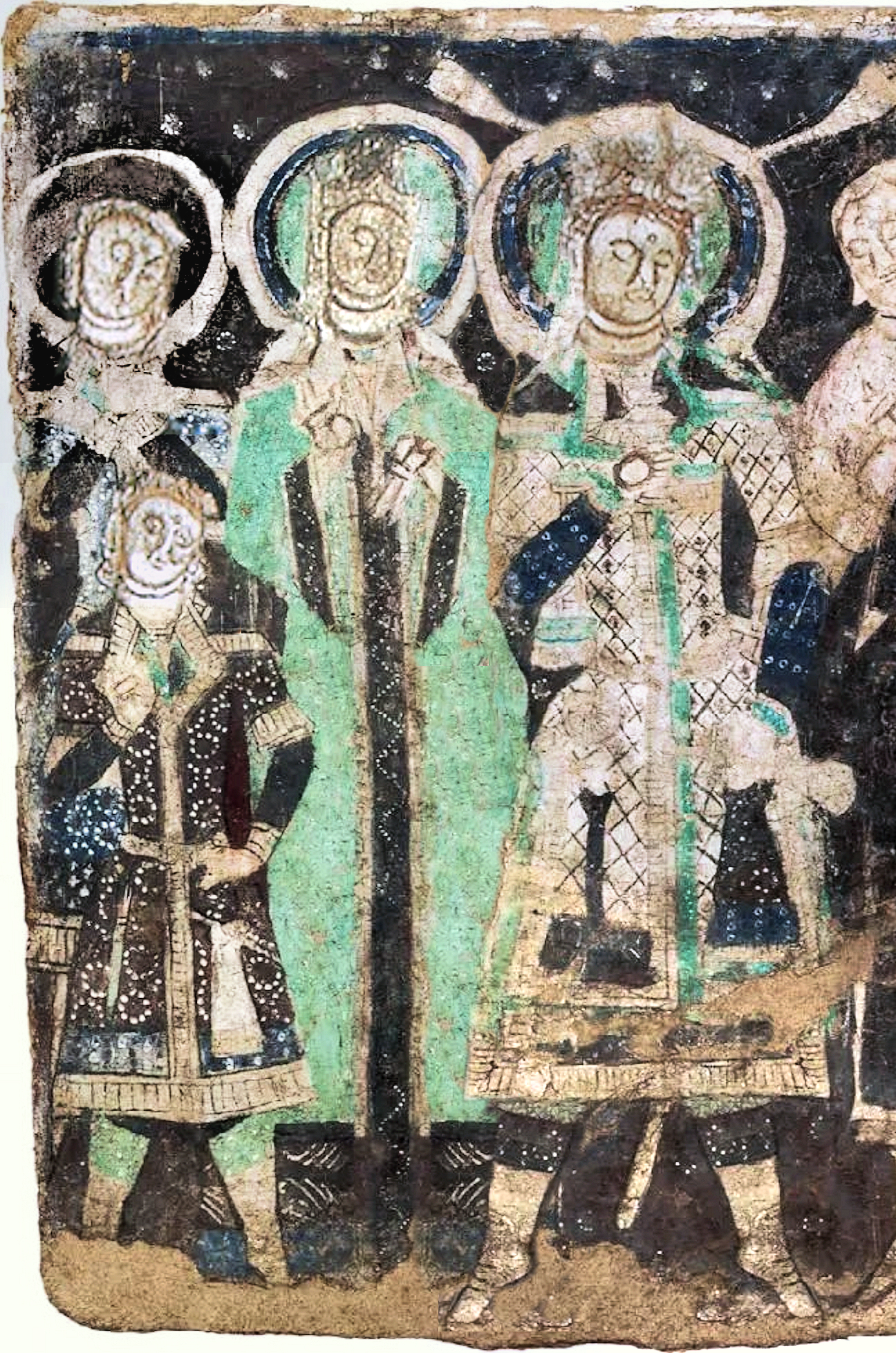
- Tocharian royal family of the oasis city-state of Kucha (King, Queen and fair-haired young princes), Cave 17, Kizil Caves. c. 500 AD, Hermitage Museum.

Regions with significant populations
- Tarim Basin in 1st millennium AD (modern-day Xinjiang, China)

Languages
- Tocharian languages

Religion
- Hinayana Buddhism and others

Related ethnic groups
- Afanasievo culture

The Tocharians or Tokharians (US: /toʊˈkɛəriənˌ -ˈkɑːr-/ toh-KAIR-ee-ən, -KAR-; UK: /tɒˈkɑːriən/ to-KAR-ee-ən) were speakers of the Tocharian languages, a group of Indo-European languages known from around 7,600 documents from the 6th and 7th centuries, found on the northern edge of the Tarim Basin (modern-day Xinjiang, China). The name "Tocharian" was given to these languages in the early 20th century by scholars who identified their speakers with a people known in ancient Greek sources as the Tókharoi (Latin: Tochari), who inhabited Bactria from the 2nd century BC. This identification is now generally considered erroneous, but the name "Tocharian" remains the most common term for the languages and their speakers. What they called themselves is unknown, although they may have referred to themselves as the Ārśi and Kuśi, or as the Agniya and Kuchiya, as known from Sanskrit texts, after their primary centres.

The origins of these people are uncertain. Links have been proposed with the Andronovo and Afanasievo cultures, as well as the Tarim mummies found in the eastern Tarim dated to the 2nd millennium BC. However, genetic analysis has revealed that the Tarim mummies were unrelated to Afanasievo, although contemporaneous populations in Dzungaria to the north did show Afanasievo ancestry and might possibly have spoken Tocharian.

Agricultural communities first appeared in the oases of the northern Tarim circa 2000 BC. By the 2nd century BC, these settlements had developed into city-states, overshadowed by nomadic peoples to the north and Chinese empires to the east. These cities, the largest of which was Kucha, also served as way stations on the branch of the Silk Road that ran along the northern edge of the Taklamakan Desert. For several centuries, the Tarim Basin was ruled by the Xiongnu, the Han dynasty, the Tibetan Empire, and the Tang dynasty. From the 8th century AD, the Uyghurs – speakers of a Turkic language – settled in the region and founded the Kingdom of Qocho that ruled the Tarim Basin. The peoples of the Tarim city-states intermixed with the Uyghurs, whose Old Uyghur language spread through the region. The Tocharian languages are believed to have become extinct during the 9th century.

== Names ==
Around the beginning of the 20th century, archaeologists recovered a number of manuscripts from oases in the Tarim Basin written in two closely related but previously unknown Indo-European languages, which were easy to read because they used a close variation of the already deciphered Indian Middle-Brahmi script. These languages were designated in similar fashion by their geographical neighbours:

- A Buddhist work in Old Turkic (Uyghur), included a colophon stating that the text had been translated from Sanskrit via toxrï tyly (Tωγry tyly, "The language of the Togari").
- Manichean texts in several languages of neighbouring regions used the expression "the land of the Four Toghar" (Toγar~Toχar, written Twγr) to designate the area "from Kucha and Karashar to Qocho and Beshbalik."

Friedrich W. K. Müller was the first to propose a characterization for the newly discovered languages. Müller called the languages "Tocharian" (German Tocharisch), linking this toxrï (Tωγry, "Togari") with the ethnonym Tókharoi (Ancient Greek: Τόχαροι) applied by Strabo to one of the "Scythian" tribes "from the country on the other side of the Iaxartes" that overran the Greco-Bactrian kingdom (present day Afghanistan) in the second half of the 2nd century BC. (Note: "Most of the Scythians, beginning from the Caspian Sea, are called Dahae Scythae, and those situated more towards the east Massagetae and Sacae; the rest have the common appellation of Scythians, but each separate tribe has its peculiar name. All, or the greatest part of them, are nomads. The best known tribes are those who deprived the Greeks of Bactriana, the Asii, Pasiani, Tochari, and Sacarauli, who came from the country on the other side of the Iaxartes, opposite the Sacae and Sogdiani" (Strabo, 11-8-2)) This term also appears in Indo-Iranian languages (Sanskrit Tushara/Tukhāra, Old Persian tuxāri-, Khotanese ttahvāra), and became the source of the term "Tokharistan" usually referring to 1st millennium Bactria, as well as the Takhar province of Afghanistan. The Tókharoi are often identified by modern scholars with the Yuezhi of Chinese historical accounts, who founded the Kushan Empire.

Müller's identification became a minority position among scholars when it turned out that the people of Tokharistan (Bactria) spoke Bactrian, an Eastern Iranian language, which is quite distinct from the Tocharian languages. Nevertheless, "Tocharian" remained the standard term for the languages of the Tarim Basin manuscripts and for the people who produced them. A few scholars argue that the Yuezhi were originally speakers of Tocharian who later adopted the Bactrian language.

The name of Kucha in Tocharian B was Kuśi, with adjectival form kuśiññe. The word may be derived from Proto-Indo-European *keuk "shining, white". The Tocharian B word akeññe may have referred to people of Agni, with a derivation meaning "borderers, marchers". One of the Tocharian A texts has ārśi-käntwā as a name for their own language, so that ārśi might have meant "Agnean", though "monk" is also possible.

Tocharian kings apparently gave themselves the title Ñäktemts soy (in Tocharian B), an equivalent of the title Devaputra ("Son of God") of the Kushans.

== Languages ==
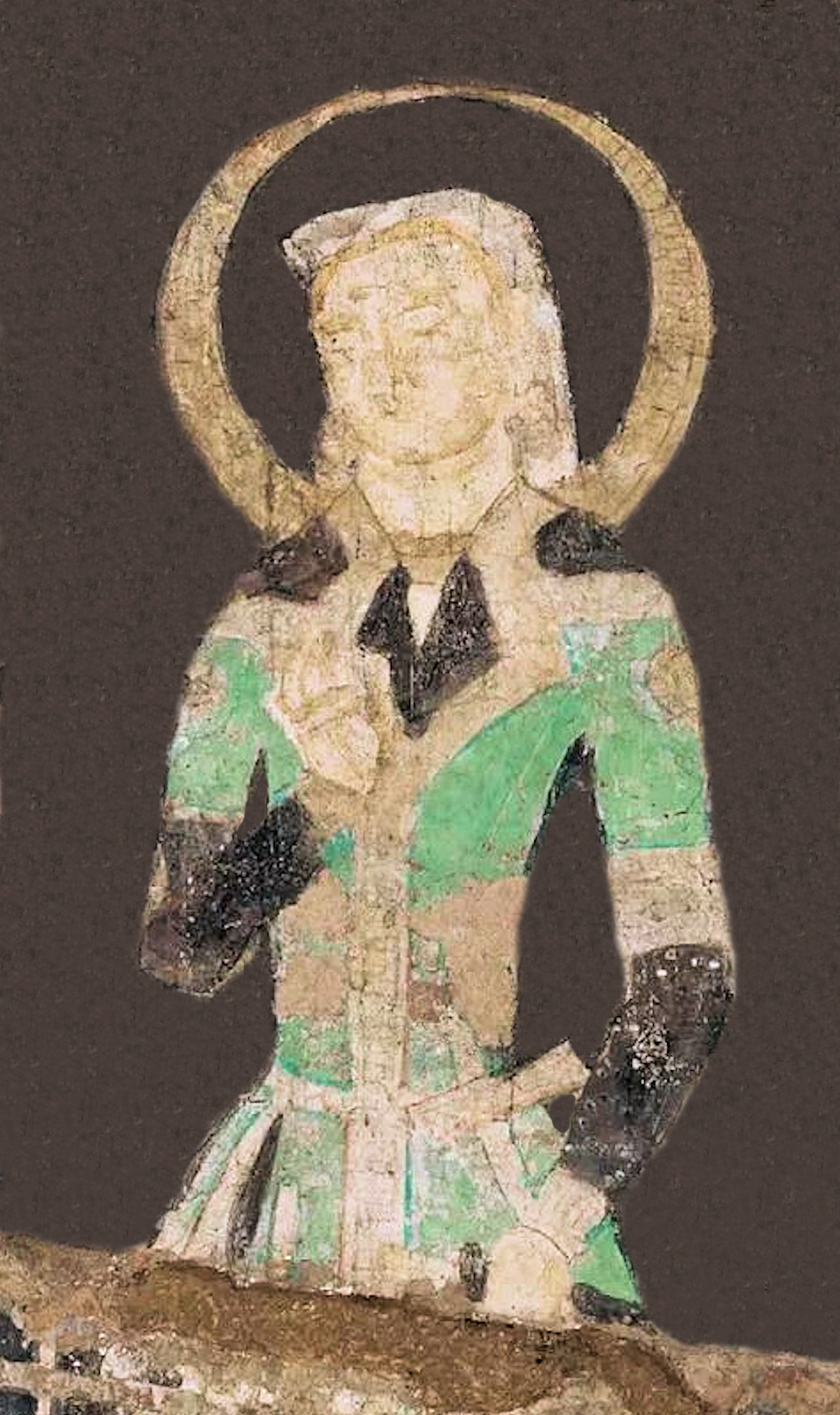
Figure of Tocharian nobility, Cave 17, Kizil Caves, circa 500 AD

The Tocharian languages are known from around 7600 documents dating from about 400 to 1200 AD, found at 30 sites in the northeast Tarim area. The manuscripts are written in two distinct, but closely related, Indo-European languages, conventionally known as Tocharian A and Tocharian B. According to glotto-chronological data, Tocharian languages are closest to Western Indo-European languages such as proto-Germanic or proto-Italic, and being devoid of satemization predate the evolution of eastern Indo-European languages.

Tocharian A (Agnean or East Tocharian) was found in the northeastern oases known to the Tocharians as Ārśi, later Agni (i.e. Chinese Yanqi; modern Karasahr) and Turpan (including Khocho or Qočo; known in Chinese as Gaochang). Some 500 manuscripts have been studied in detail, mostly coming from Buddhist monasteries. Many authors take this to imply that Tocharian A had become a purely literary and liturgical language by the time of the manuscripts, but it may be that the surviving documents are unrepresentative.

Tocharian B (Kuchean or West Tocharian) was found at all the Tocharian A sites and also in several sites further west, including Kuchi (later Kucha). It appears to have still been in use in daily life at that time. Over 3200 manuscripts have been studied in detail.

The languages had significant differences in phonology, morphology and vocabulary, making them mutually unintelligible "at least as much as modern Germanic or Romance languages". Tocharian A shows innovations in the vowels and nominal inflection, whereas Tocharian B has changes in the consonants and verbal inflection. Many of the differences in vocabulary between the languages concern Buddhist concepts, which may suggest that they were associated with different Buddhist traditions.

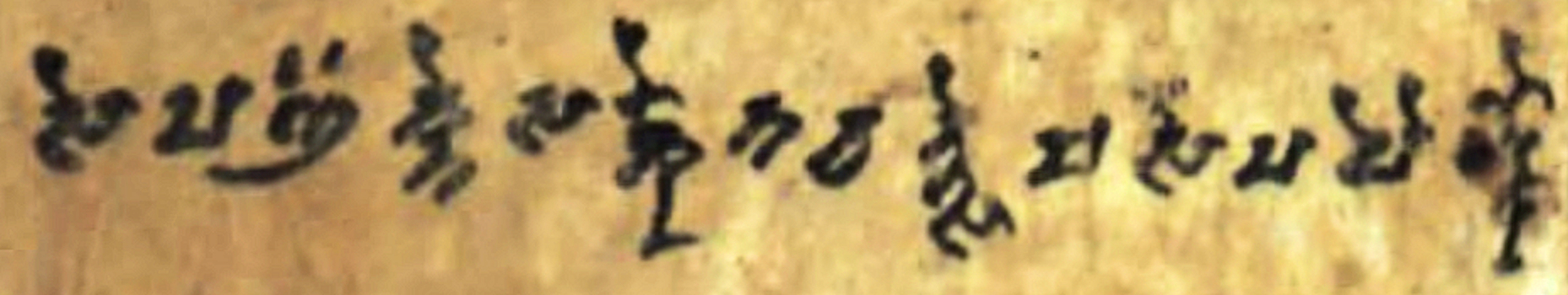
The Tocharian script is very similar to the Indian Brahmi script from the Kushan period, with only slight variations in calligraphy. Tocharian language inscription: Se pañäkte saṅketavattse ṣarsa papaiykau "This Buddha was painted by the hand of Sanketava", on a painting carbon dated to 245-340 AD.

The differences indicate that they diverged from a common ancestor between 500 and 1000 years before the earliest documents, that is, sometime in the 1st millennium BC. Common Indo-European vocabulary retained in Tocharian includes words for herding, cattle, sheep, pigs, dogs, horses, textiles, farming, wheat, gold, silver, and wheeled vehicles.

Prakrit documents from 3rd century Krorän, Andir and Niya on the southeast edge of the Tarim Basin contain around 100 loanwords and 1000 proper names that cannot be traced to an Indic or Iranian source. Thomas Burrow suggested that they come from a variety of Tocharian, dubbed Tocharian C or Kroränian, which may have been spoken by at least some of the local populace. Burrow's theory is widely accepted, but the evidence is meagre and inconclusive, and some scholars favour alternative explanations.

== Religion ==
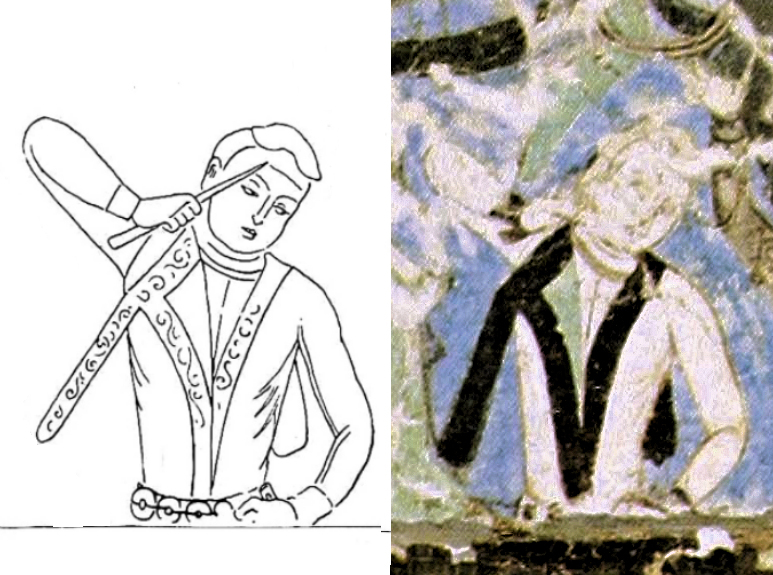
Tocharian Prince mourning the Cremation of the Buddha, in a mural from Maya Cave (224) in Kizil. He is cutting his forehead with a knife, a practice of self-mutilation also known among the Scythians.

Most of the Tocharian inscriptions are based on Buddhist monastic texts, which suggests that the Tocharians largely embraced Buddhism. The pre-Buddhist beliefs of the Tocharians are largely unknown, but several Chinese goddesses are similar to the reconstructed Proto-Indo-European sun goddess and the dawn goddess, which implies that the Chinese were influenced by the pre-Buddhist beliefs of the Tocharians when they traveled on trade routes which were located in Tocharian territories. Tocharian B has a noun swāñco derived from the name of the Proto-Indo-European sun goddess, while Tocharian A has koṃ, a loanword etymologically connected to the Turkic sun goddess Gun Ana. Besides this, they might have also worshipped a lunar deity (meñ-) and an earth one (keṃ-).

The murals found in the Tarim Basin, especially those of the Kizil Caves, mostly depict Jataka stories, avadanas, and legends of the Buddha, and are an artistic representation in the tradition of the Nikaya school of the Sarvastivadas. When the Chinese Monk Xuanzang visited Kucha in 630 AD, he received the favours of the Tocharian king Suvarnadeva, the son and successor of Suvarnapushpa, whom he described as a believer of Hinayana Buddhism. In the account of his travel to Kucha (屈支国) he stated that "There are about one hundred convents (saṅghārāmas) in this country, with five thousand and more disciples. These belong to the Little Vehicle of the school of the Sarvāstivādas (zhuyiqieyoubu). Their doctrine (teaching of Sūtras) and their rules of discipline (principles of the Vinaya) are like those of India, and those who read them use the same (originals)."

== Proposed precursors ==
The route by which speakers of Indo-European languages reached the Tarim Basin is uncertain. A leading contender is the Afanasievo culture, who occupied the Altai region to the north between 3300 and 2500 BC.

=== Afanasievo culture ===
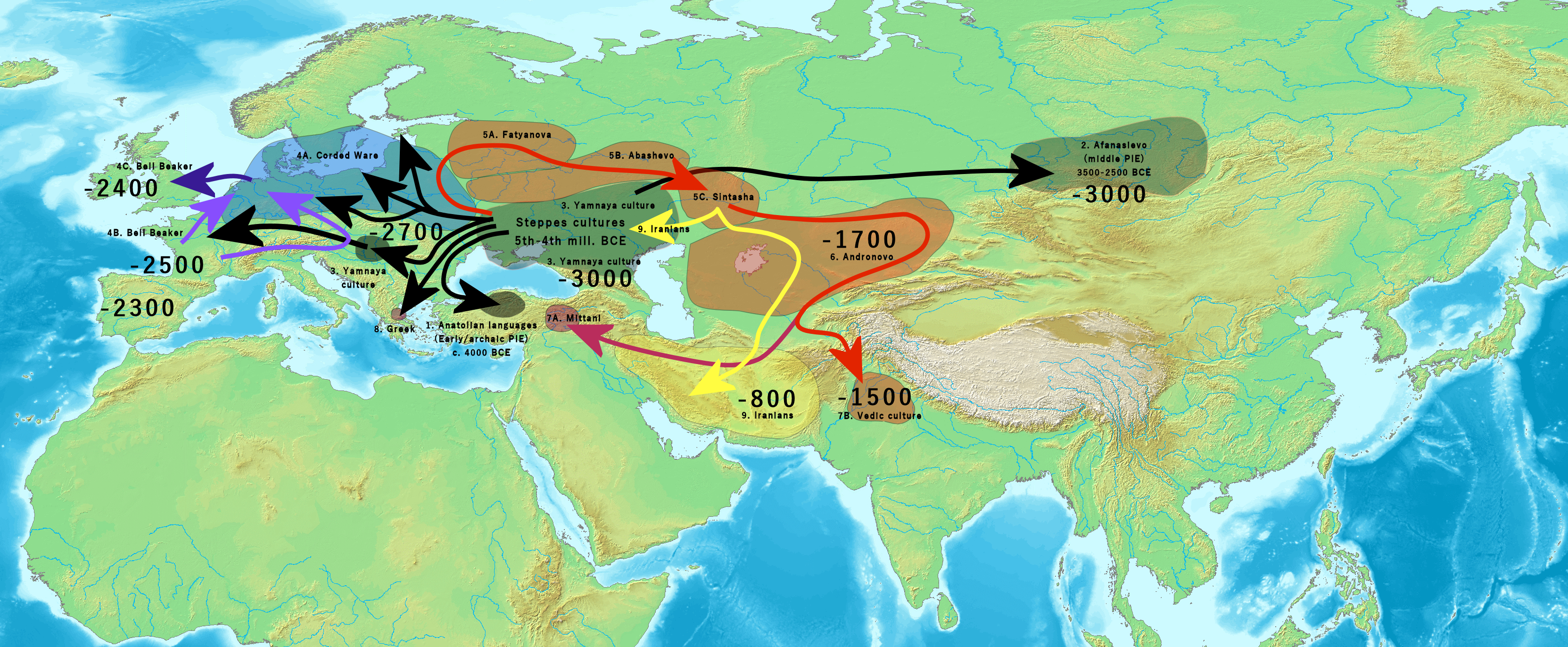
Indo-European migrations, with location of the Afanasievo culture (genetically identical to the Yamnaya culture of the Pontic steppes) and their probable Tocharian descendants.

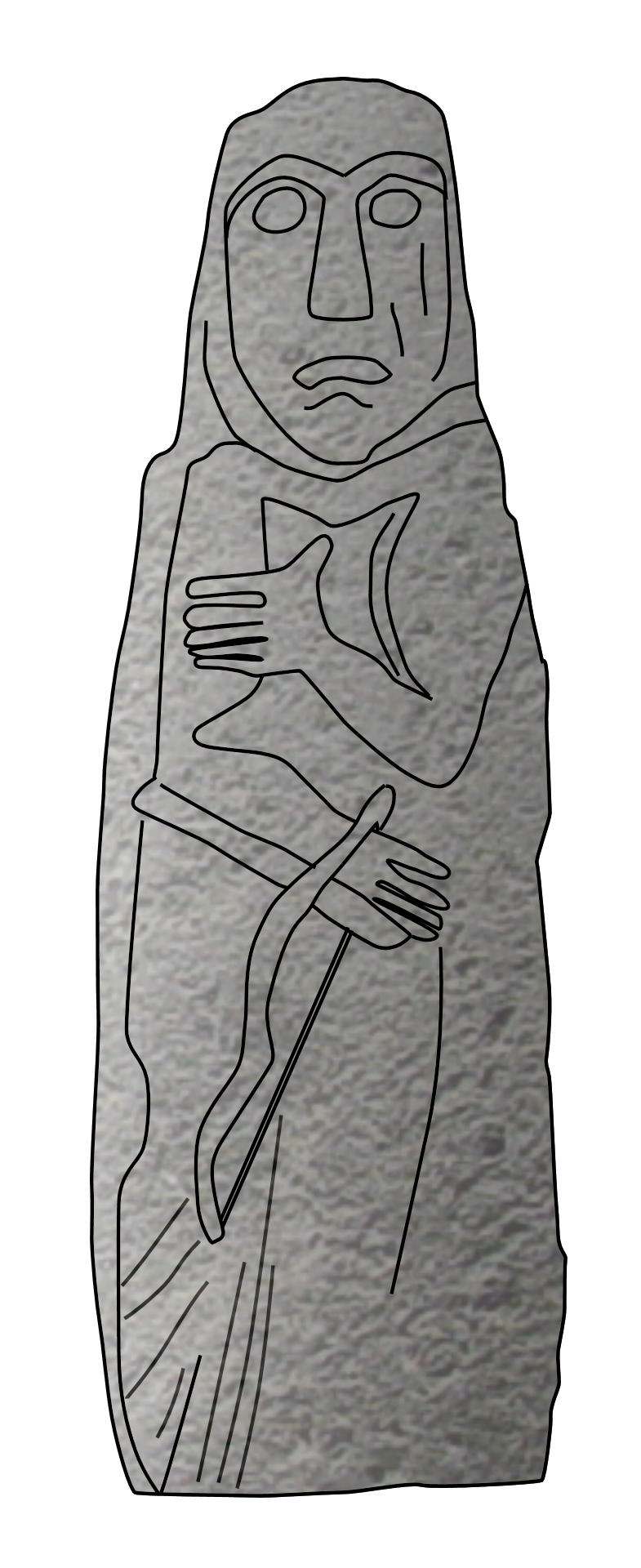
Chemurchek statue, Khukh uzuuriin dugui I - 1. Bulgan, Khovd, Mongolia

The Afanasievo culture resulted from an eastern offshoot of the Yamnaya culture, originally based in the Pontic steppe north of the Caucasus Mountains. The Afanasievo culture (c. 3500–2500 BC) displays cultural and genetic connections with the Indo-European-associated cultures of the Central Asian steppe yet predates the specifically Indo-Iranian-associated Andronovo culture (c. 2000–900 BC).

J. P. Mallory and Victor H. Mair argued that the Tarim Basin was first settled by Proto-Tocharian-speakers from an eastern offshoot of the Afanasievo culture, who migrated to the south and occupied the northern and eastern edges of the basin. The early eastward expansion of the Yamnaya culture circa 3300 BC is enough to account for the isolation of the Tocharian languages from Indo-Iranian linguistic innovations like satemization. Michaël Peyrot argues that several of the most striking typological peculiarities of Tocharian are rooted in a prolonged contact of Proto-Tocharian-speaking Afanasievans with speakers of an early stage of Proto-Samoyedic in South Siberia. Among others, this might explain the merger of all three-stop series (e.g., *k, *g, *gʰ > *k), which must have led to a huge amount of homonyms, as well as the development of an agglutinative case system.

Chao Ning et al. (2019) found in burials from around 200 BC at the Shirenzigou site on the eastern edge of Dzungaria 20–80% Yamnaya-like ancestry, lending support to the hypothesis of a migration from Afanasievo into Dzungaria, which is just north of the Tarim Basin.

=== Chemurchek culture ===
According to archaeologist Alexey Kovalev, the Chemurchek culture (2750–1900 BC), an Altaic culture with many similarities with cultures of Western Europe and especially Southern France in burial and statuary styles, may have been associated with the Proto-Tokharians. According to glotto-chronological data, proto-Tokharians must have migrated to the east around the same period, and their Western Indo-European language is closest to proto-Germanic and proto-Italic, corresponding to the broad geographical area encompassing southern France where the style most similar to those of the Chemurchek culture have been identified. The language of the Chemurchek/Proto-Tokharians may have originated from the same general location in Western Europe, as did their burial and statuary styles.

== Tarim Basin ==
=== Early settlement ===
The Taklamakan Desert is roughly oval in shape, about 1,000 km long and 400 km wide, surrounded on three sides by high mountains. The main part of the desert is sandy, surrounded by a belt of gravel desert. The desert is completely barren, but in the late spring the melting snows of the surrounding mountains feed streams, which have been altered by human activity to create oases with mild microclimates and supporting intensive agriculture. On the northern edge of the basin, these oases occur in small valleys before the gravels. On the southern edge, they occur in alluvial fans on the edge of the sand zone. Isolated alluvial fan oases also occur in the gravel deserts of the Turpan Depression to the east of the Taklamakan. From around 2000 BC, these oases supported Bronze Age settled agricultural communities of steadily increasing sophistication.

The necessary irrigation technology was first developed during the 3rd millennium BC in the Bactria-Margiana Archaeological Complex (BMAC) to the west of the Pamir mountains, but it is unclear how it reached the Tarim. The staple crops, wheat and barley, also originated in the west.

=== Tarim mummies ===
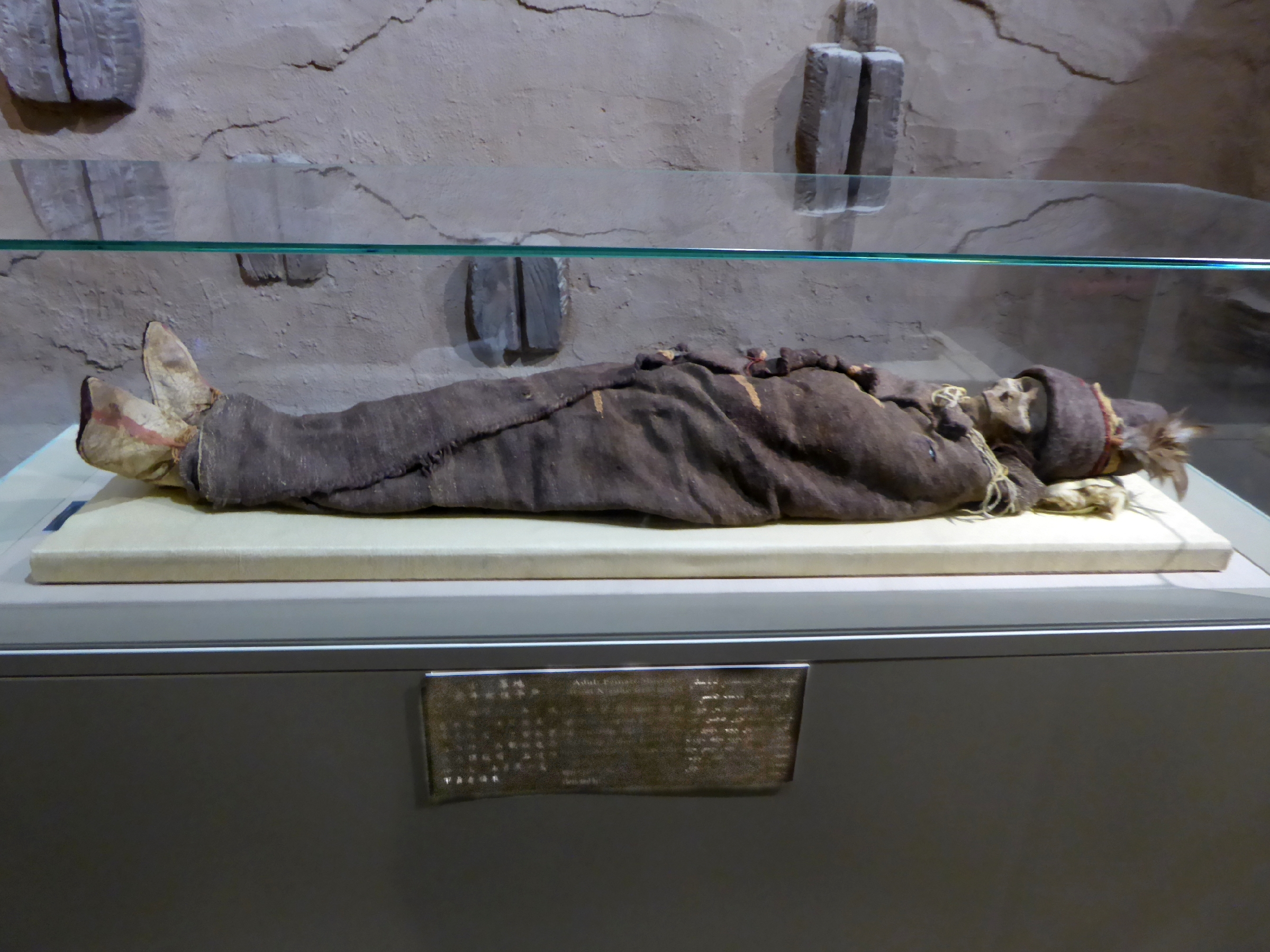
One of the Tarim mummies

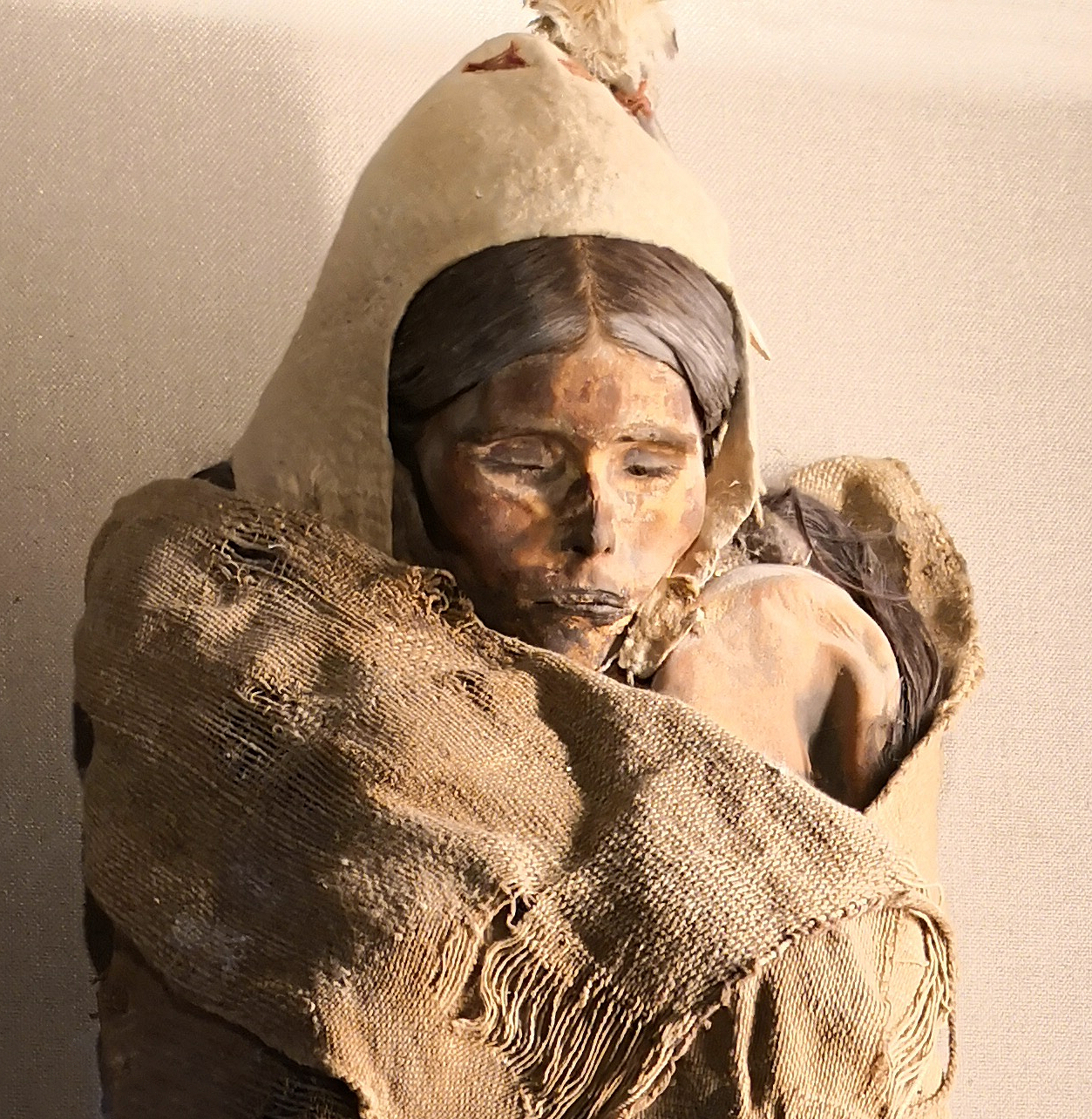
"Loulan beauty"

The oldest of the Tarim mummies, bodies preserved by the desert conditions, date from 2000 BC and were found on the eastern edge of the Tarim Basin. The mummies have been described as being both traditionally European and East Asian in appearance, and mixed-race individuals are also observed. The mummies were found with plaid-woven tapestries that are notably similar to the weaving pattern of the "tartan" style of the Hallstatt culture of central Europe, associated with Celts; the wool used in the tapestries was found to come from sheep with European ancestry.

It is unknown whether the mummies are connected with the frescoes painted at Tocharian sites more than two millennia later, which also depict some figures with light hair color. A genetic study of remains from the oldest layer of the Xiaohe Cemetery found that the maternal lineages were a mixture of east and west Eurasian types, while all the paternal lineages were of west Eurasian type. A genomic study published in 2021 found that while contemporaneous populations in Dzungaria to the north had Afanasievo ancestry, the Tarim mummies were unrelated to Afanasievo populations and instead were an isolated local population of Ancient North Eurasian ancestry.

The demographic make-up of the Tarim Basin evolved from the Late Bronze Age, particularly in the western part. Inhabitants of a Late Bronze Age site in the far west of the Tarim Basin, dated 1600 to 1400 BC, were overwhelmingly descended from Sintashta and Andronovo populations.

=== Later migrations ===
Later, groups of nomadic pastoralists moved from the steppe into the grasslands to the north and northeast of the Tarim. They were the ancestors of peoples later known to Chinese authors as the Wusun and Yuezhi. It is thought that at least some of them spoke Iranian languages, but a minority of scholars suggest that the Yuezhi were Tocharian speakers.

During the 1st millennium BC, a further wave of immigrants, the Saka speaking Iranian languages, arrived from the west and settled along the southern rim of the Tarim. They are believed to be the source of Iranian loanwords in Tocharian languages, particularly related to commerce and warfare. The Subeshi culture is a candidate for the Iron Age predecessors of the Tocharians.

== Oasis states ==
Major oasis states of the ancient Tarim Basin

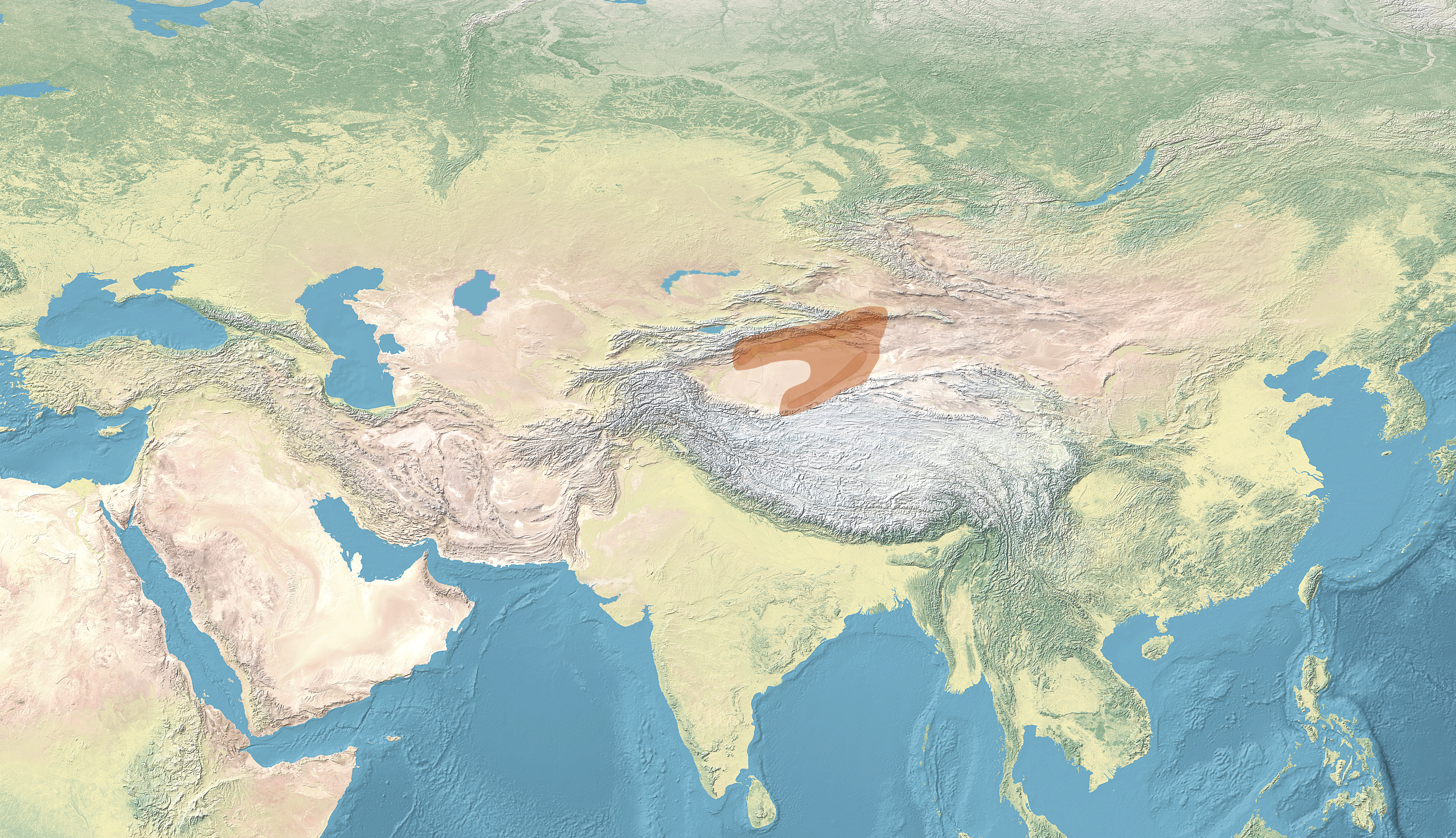
The Tocharians and contemporary Asian polities c. 500 AD.

The first record of the oasis states is found in Chinese histories. The Book of Han lists 36 statelets in the Tarim basin in the last two centuries BC. These oases served as waystations on the trade routes forming part of the Silk Road passing along the northern and southern edges of the Taklamakan desert.

The largest were Kucha with 81,000 inhabitants and Agni (Yanqi or Karashar) with 32,000. Next was the Loulan Kingdom (Krorän), first mentioned in 126 BC. Chinese histories give no evidence of ethnic changes in these cities between that time and the period of the Tocharian manuscripts from these sites. Situated on the northern and southern edges of the Tarim, these small urban societies were overshadowed by nomadic peoples to the north and Chinese empires to the east. They became the object of rivalry between the Chinese and the Xiongnu. They conceded tributary relations with the larger powers when required, and acted independently when they could.

=== Xiongnu and Han empires ===
In 177 BC, the Xiongnu drove the Yuezhi from western Gansu, causing most of them to flee west to the Ili Valley and then to Bactria. The Xiongnu then overcame the Tarim statelets, which became a vital part of their empire. The Chinese Han dynasty was determined to weaken their Xiongnu enemies by depriving them of this area. This was achieved in a series of campaigns beginning in 108 BC and culminating in the establishment of the Protectorate of the Western Regions in 60 BC under Zheng Ji. The Han government used a range of tactics, including plots to assassinate local rulers, direct attacks on a few states (e.g. Kucha in 65 BC) to cow the rest, and the massacre of the entire population of Luntai (80 km east of Kucha) when they resisted.

During the Later Han (25–220 AD), the whole Tarim Basin again became a focus of rivalry between the Xiong-nu to the north and the Chinese to the east. In 74 AD, Chinese troops started to take control of the Tarim Basin with the conquest of Turfan. During the 1st century AD, Kucha resisted the Chinese invasion, and allied itself with the Xiong-nu and the Yuezhi against the Chinese general Ban Chao. Even the Kushan Empire of Kujula Kadphises sent an army to the Tarim Basin to support Kucha, but they retreated after minor encounters.

In 124, Kucha formally submitted to the Chinese court, and by 127 China had conquered the whole of the Tarim Basin. China's control of the Silk Road facilitated the exchange of art and the propagation of Buddhism from Central Asia. The Roman Maes Titianus is known to have visited the area in the 2nd century AD, as did numerous great Buddhist missionaries such as the Parthian An Shigao, the Yuezhis Lokaksema and Zhi Qian, or the Indian Chu Sho-fu (竺朔佛). The Han controlled the Tarim states until their final withdrawal in 150 AD.

==== Kushan Empire (2nd century AD) ====
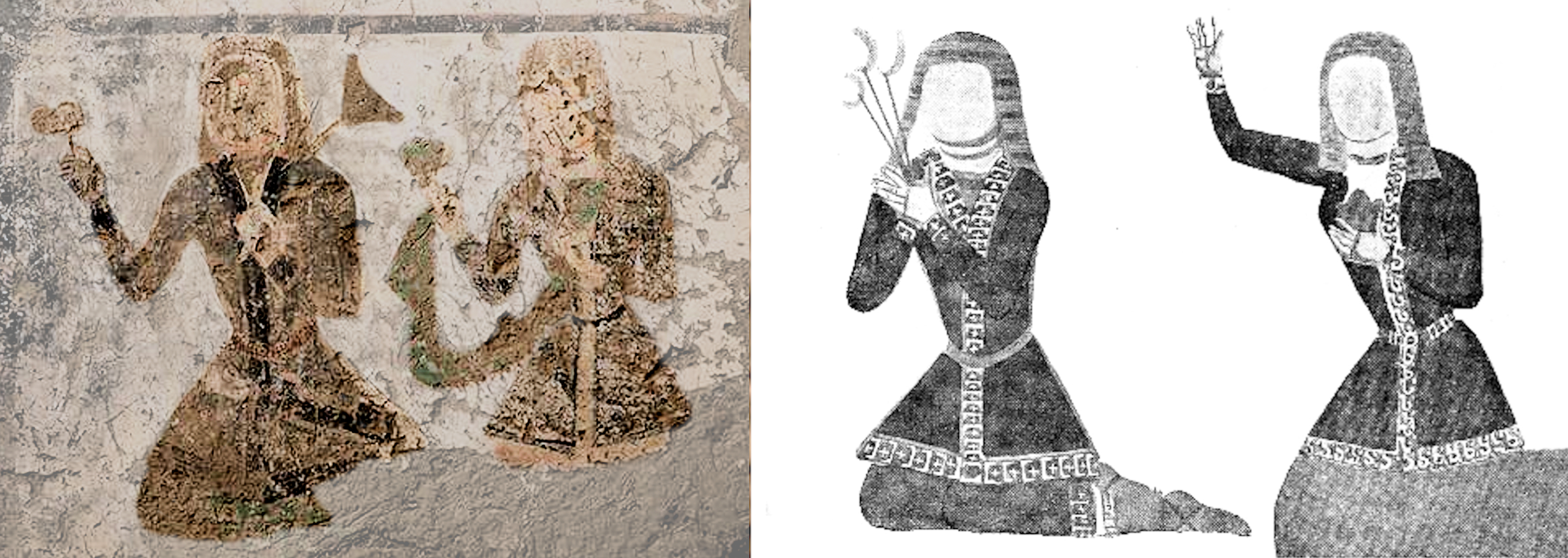
Tocharian kneeling devotees circa 300 AD, in the paintings of the Cave of the Hippocampi (Cave 118), Kizil Caves.

The Kushan Empire expanded into the Tarim during the 2nd century AD, bringing Buddhism, Kushan art, Sanskrit as a liturgical language and Prakrit as an administrative language (in the southern Tarim states). With these Indic languages came scripts, including the Brahmi script (later adapted to write Tocharian) and the Kharosthi script.

From the 3rd century, Kucha became a center of Buddhist studies. Buddhist texts were translated into Chinese by Kuchean monks, the most famous of whom was Kumārajīva (344–412/5). Captured by Lü Guang of the Later Liang in an attack on Kucha in 384, Kumārajīva learned Chinese during his years of captivity in Gansu. In 401, he was brought to the Later Qin capital of Chang'an, where he remained as head of a translation bureau until his death in 413.

The Kizil Caves lie 65 km west of Kucha, and contain over 236 Buddhist temples. Their murals date from the 3rd to the 8th century. Many of these murals were removed by Albert von Le Coq and other European archaeologists in the early 20th century, and are now held in European museums, but others remain in their original locations.

An increasingly dry climate in the 4th and 5th centuries led to the abandonment of several of the southern cities, including Niya and Krorän, with a consequent shift of trade from the southern route to the northern one. Confederations of nomadic tribes also began to jostle for supremacy. The northern oasis states were conquered by Rouran in the late 5th century, leaving the local leaders in place. The nearby area of Gaochang and the Jushi Kingdom were alternatively ruled as a Chinese Prefecture, taken over by the Northern Liang in 442 CE, conquered by the Rouran Khaganate in 460, and conquered by the Gaoju Turks in 488.

=== Flourishing of the oasis states ===
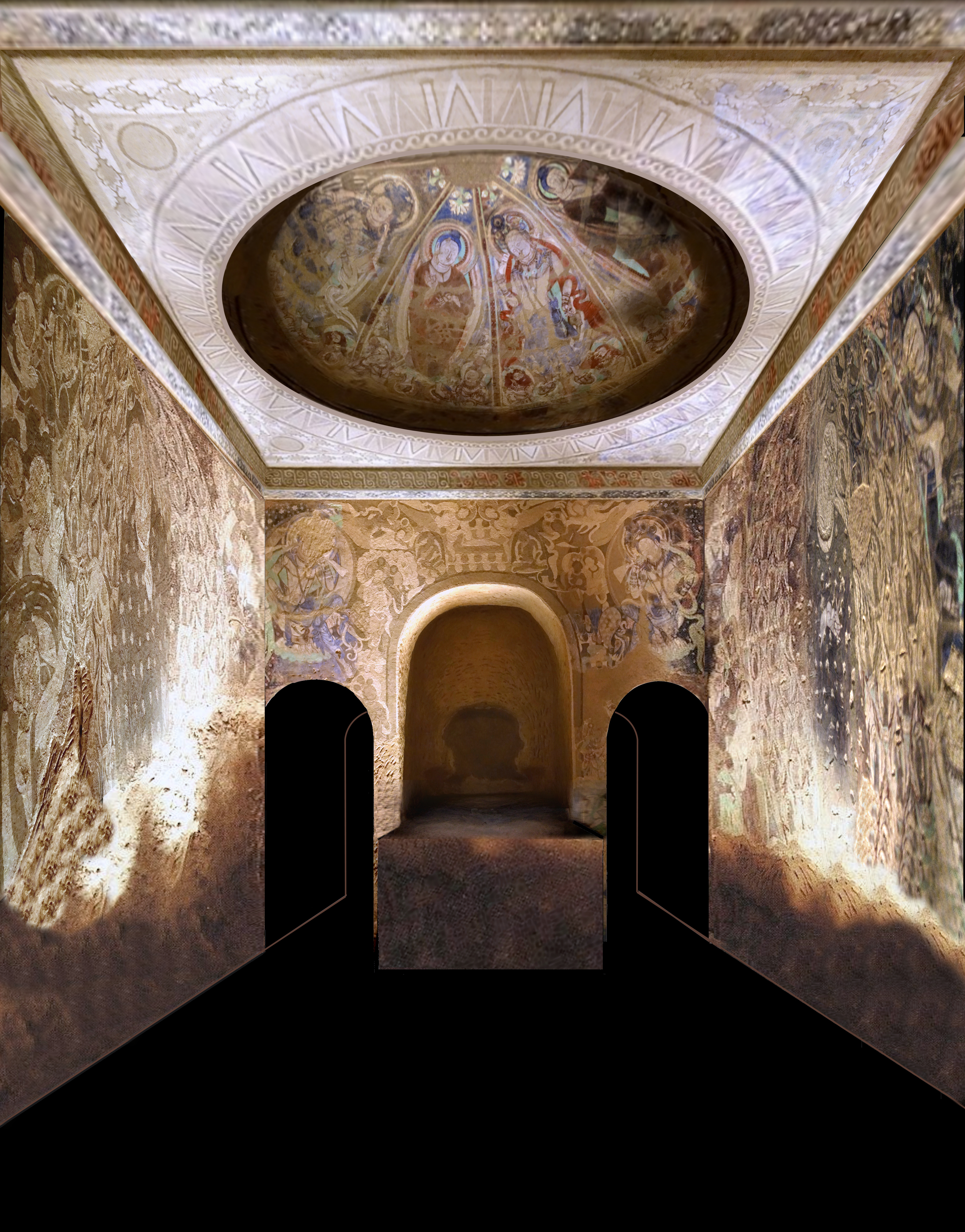
The Buddhist Cave with the Ring-Bearing Doves (Cave 123) at the Kizil Caves near Kucha, built circa 430-530 AD.

Kucha, the largest of the oasis cities, was ruled by royal families sometimes autonomously and sometimes as vassals of outside powers. The Chinese named these Kuchean kings by adding the prefix Bai (白), meaning "White", probably pointing to the fair complexion of the Kucheans. The government included some 30 named posts below the king, with all but the highest-ranking titles occurring in pairs of left and right. Other states had similar structures, though on a smaller scale. The Book of Jin says of the city:

They have a walled city and suburbs. The walls are threefold. Within are Buddhist temples and stupas numbering a thousand. The people are engaged in agriculture and husbandry. The men and women cut their hair and wear it at the neck. The prince's palace is grand and imposing, glittering like an abode of the gods.

— Book of Jin, Chapter 97

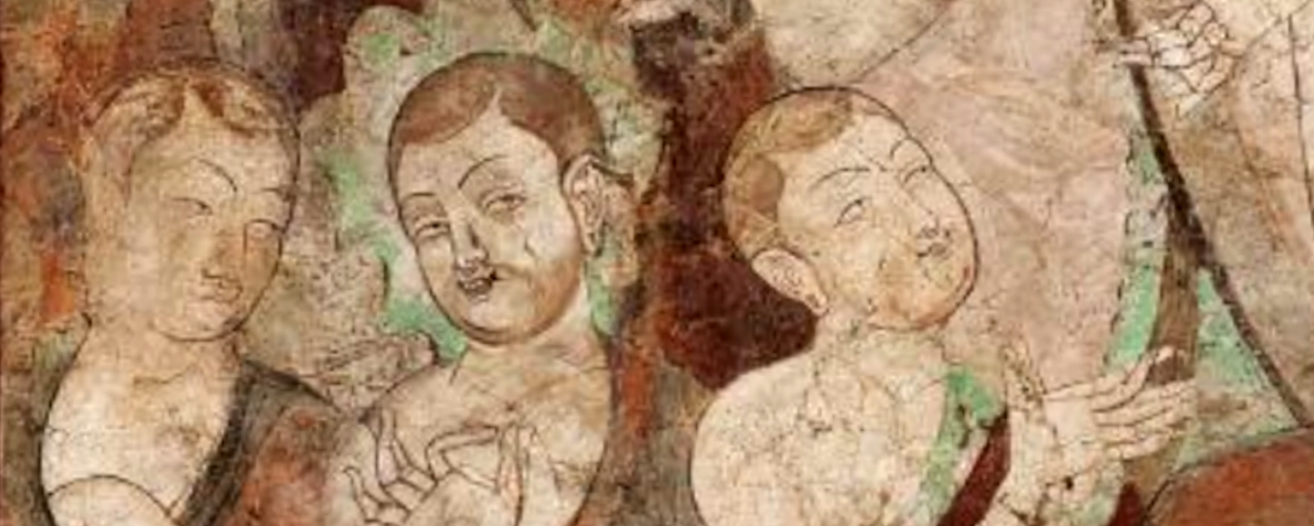
Monks from the Cave of the Painters circa 500 AD, Kizil Caves.

The inhabitants grew red millet, wheat, rice, legumes, hemp, grapes and pomegranates, and reared horses, cattle, sheep and camels.

They also extracted a wide range of metals and minerals from the surrounding mountains. Handicrafts included leather goods, fine felts and rugs.

In the Kizil Caves appear portraits of Royal families, composed of the King, Queen and young Prince. They are accompanied by monks, and men in caftan. According to Historian of Art Benjamin Rowland, these portraits show "that the Tocharians were European rather than Mongol in appearance, with light complexions, blue eyes, and blond or reddish hair, and the costumes of the knights and their ladies have haunting suggestions of the chivalric age of the West".

Kucha ambassador are known to have visited the Chinese court of Emperor Yuan of Liang in his capital Jingzhou in 516–520 AD, at or around the same time as the Hepthalite embassies there. An ambassador from Kucha is illustrated in Portraits of Periodical Offering of Liang, painted in 526–539 AD, an 11th-century Song copy of which as remained.

==== Hephthalite conquest (circa 480–550 AD) ====
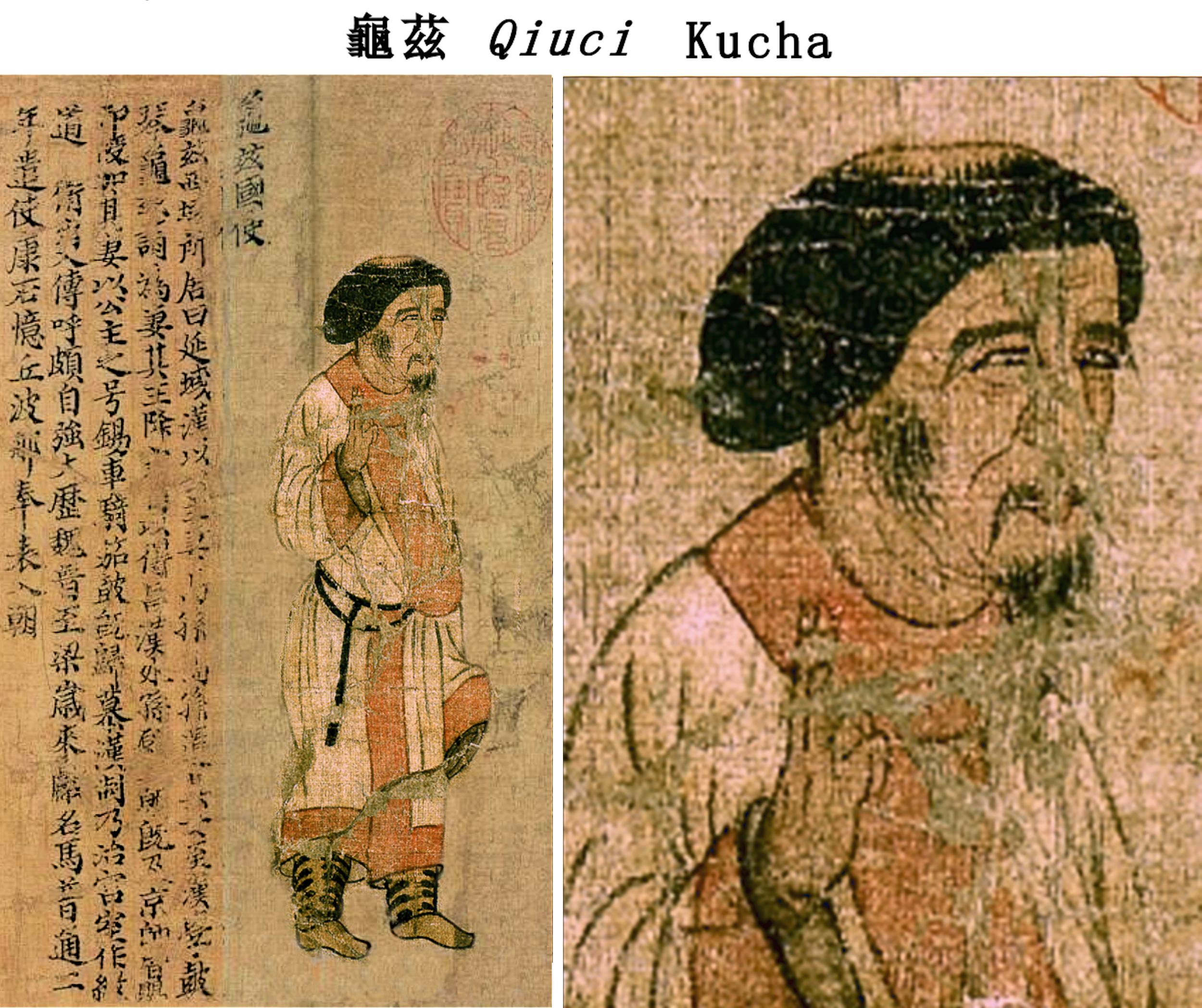
Ambassador from Kucha (龜茲國 Qiuci-guo), one of the main Tocharian cities, visiting the Chinese Southern Liang court in Jingzhou circa 516–520 AD at the time of Hephthalite domination over the region, with explanatory text. Portraits of Periodical Offering of Liang, 11th century Song copy.

In the late 5th century AD the Hephthalites, based in Tokharistan (Bactria), expanded eastward through the Pamir Mountains, which are comparatively easy to cross, as did the Kushans before them, due to the presence of convenient plateaus between high peaks. They occupied the western Tarim Basin (Kashgar and Khotan), taking control of the area from the Rourans, who had been collecting heavy tribute from the oasis cities, but were now weakening under the assaults of the Chinese Wei dynasty. In 479 they took the east end of the Tarim Basin, around the region of Turfan. In 497–509, they pushed north of Turfan to the Urumchi region. In the early years of the 6th century, they were sending embassies from their dominions in the Tarim Basin to the Wei dynasty. The Hephthalites continued to occupy the Tarim Basin until the end of their Empire, circa 560 AD.

As the territories ruled by the Hephthalites expanded into Central Asia and the Tarim Basin, the art of the Hephthalites, with characteristic clothing and hairstyles, also came to be used in the areas they ruled, such as Sogdiana, Bamiyan or Kucha in the Tarim Basin (Kizil Caves, Kumtura Caves, Subashi reliquary). In these areas appear dignitaries with caftans with a triangular collar on the right side, crowns with three crescents, some crowns with wings, and a unique hairstyle. Another marker is the two-point suspension system for swords, which seems to have been an Hephthalite innovation, and was introduced by them in the territories they controlled. The paintings from the Kucha region, particularly the swordmen in the Kizil Caves, appear to have been made during Hephthalite rule in the region, circa 480–550 AD. The influence of the art of Gandhara in some of the earliest paintings at the Kizil Caves, dated to circa 500 AD, is considered as a consequence of the political unification of the area between Bactria and Kucha under the Hephthalites.

==== Göktürks suzerainty (560 AD) ====
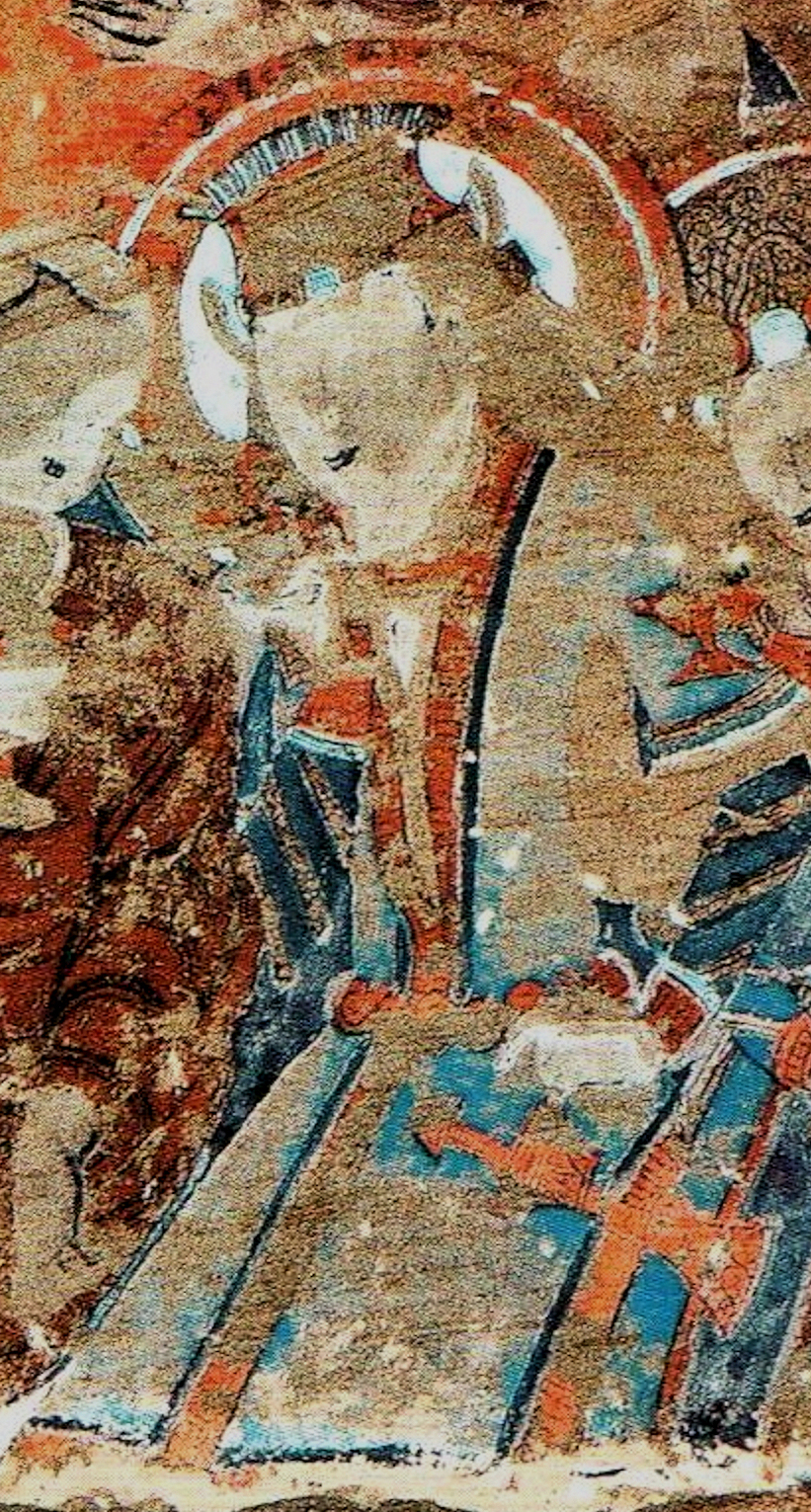
King Suvarnapushpa of Kucha is historically known and ruled 600–625 AD. Cave 69, Kizil Caves.

The early Turks of the First Turkic Khaganate then took control of the Turfan and Kucha areas from around 560 AD, and, in alliance with the Sasanian Empire, became instrumental in the fall of the Hephthalite Empire.

The Turks then split into Western and Eastern Khaganates by 580 AD. Tocharian royal families continued to rule Kucha, as vassals of the Western Turks, to whom they provided tribute and troops. Many surviving texts in Tocharian date from this period, and deal with a wide variety of administrative, religious and everyday topics. They also include travel passes, small slips of poplar wood giving the size of the permitted caravans for officials at the next station along the road.

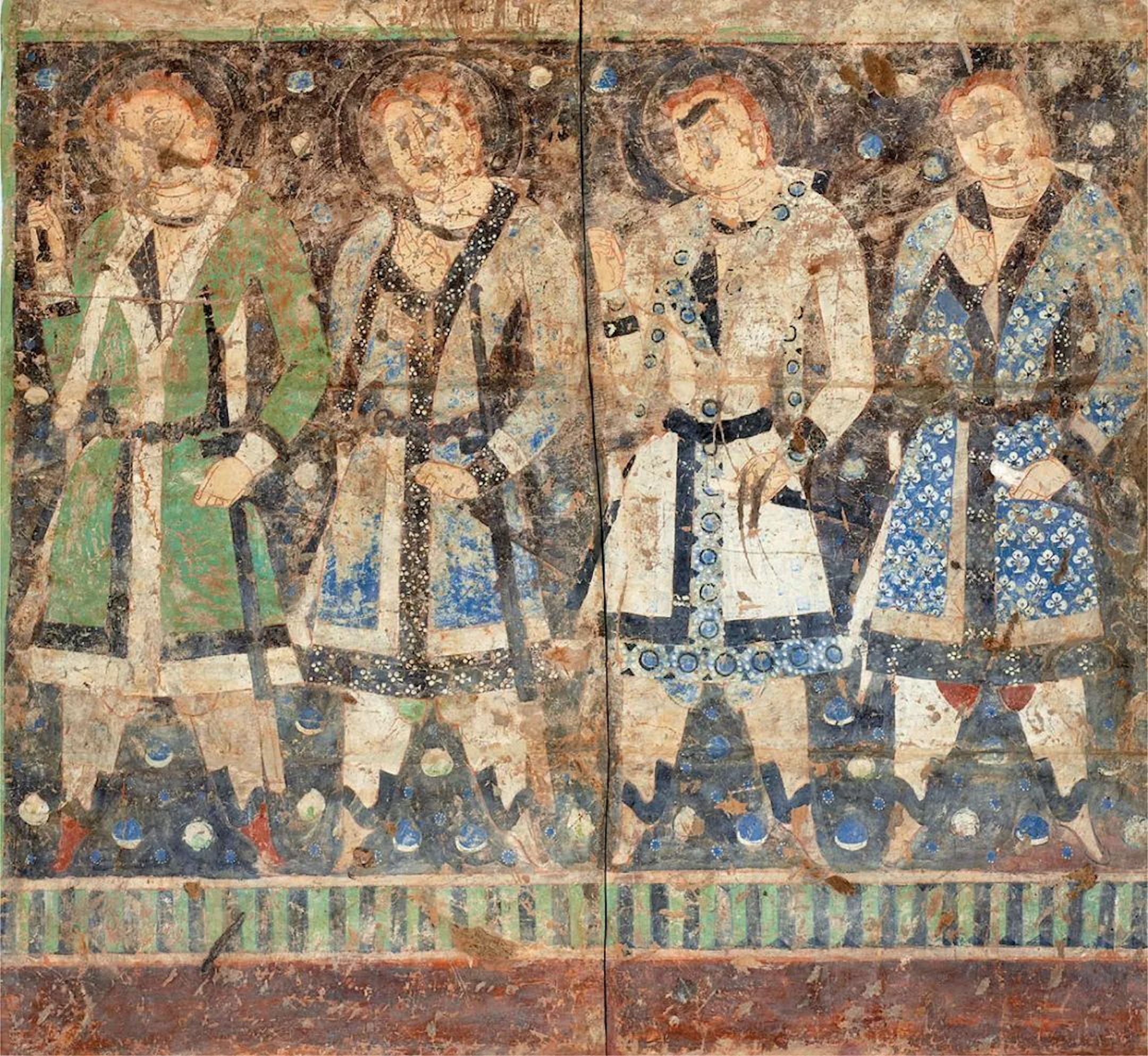
Tocharian knights from Kizil Caves (Cave 16). Circa 600 AD

In 618, king Suvarnapushpa of Kucha sent an embassy to the court of the Tang dynasty acknowledging vassalship.

In 630, the Chinese Buddhist monk Xuanzang visited the cities of the Tarim Basin on his pilgrimage to India. He later described the characteristics of Kucha (屈支国) in great detail in his Records of the Western Regions:

- "The style of writing is Indian, with some differences"
- "They clothe themselves with ornamental garments of silk and embroidery. They cut their hair and wear a flowing covering (over their heads)"
- "The king is of Kuchean race"
- "There are about one hundred convents (saṅghārāmas) in this country, with five thousand and more disciples. These belong to the Little Vehicle of the school of the Sarvāstivādas (Shwo-yih-tsai-yu-po). Their doctrine (teaching of Sūtras) and their rules of discipline (principles of the Vinaya) are like those of India, and those who read them use the same (originals)."
- "About 40 li to the north of this desert city there are two convents close together on the slope of a mountain".

=== Tang conquest and aftermath ===
In the 7th century, Emperor Taizong of Tang China, having overcome the Eastern Turks, sent his armies west to attack the Western Turks and the oasis states. The first oasis to fall was Turfan, which was captured in 630 and annexed as part of China.

Emperor Taizong's campaign against the oasis states

Next to the west lay the city of Agni, which had been a tributary of the Tang since 632. Alarmed by the nearby Chinese armies, Agni stopped sending Tribute to China and formed an alliance with the Western Turks. They were aided by Kucha, who also stopped sending tribute. The Tang captured Agni in 644, defeating a Western Turk relief force, and made the king of Kucha Suvarnadeva (Chinese: 蘇伐疊 Sufadie) resume tribute. When that king was deposed by a relative named Haripushpa (Chinese: 訶黎布失畢 Helibushibi) in 648, the Tang sent an army under the Turk general Ashina She'er to install a compliant member of the local royal family, a younger brother of Haripushpa. Ashina She'er continued to capture Kucha, and made it the headquarters of the Tang Protectorate General to Pacify the West. Kuchean forces recaptured the city and killed protector-general, Guo Xiaoke, but it fell again to Ashina She'er, who had 11,000 of the inhabitants executed in reprisal for the killing of Guo. It was also recorded about other cities that "he destroyed five great towns and with them many myriads of men and women... the lands of the west were seized with terror." The Tocharian cities never recovered from the Tang conquest.

The Tang lost the Tarim basin to the Tibetan Empire in 670, but regained it in 692, and continued to rule there until it was recaptured by the Tibetans in 792. The ruling Bai family of Kucha are last mentioned in Chinese sources in 787. There is little mention of the region in Chinese sources for the 9th and 10th centuries.

The Uyghur Khaganate took control of the northern Tarim in 803. After their capital in Mongolia was sacked by the Yenisei Kyrgyz in 840, they established a new state, the Kingdom of Qocho with its capital at Gaochang (near Turfan) in 866. Over centuries of contact and intermarriage, the cultures and populations of the pastoralist rulers and their agriculturalist subjects blended together. Modern Uyghurs are the result of admixture between the Tocharians and the Orkhon Uyghurs from the 8th century CE. Many Uyghurs converted to the Tocharian Buddhism or Nestorian Christianity, and adopted the agricultural lifestyle and many of the customs of the oasis-dwellers. The Tocharian language gradually disappeared as the urban population switched to the Old Uyghur language.

=== Epigraphy ===
Most of the texts known from the Tocharians are religious, except for one known love poem in Tocharian B (manuscript B-496, found in Kizil):

Tocharian B manuscript B-496
Translation
(English)

I.
... for a thousand years however, Thou wilt tell the story Thy (...) I announce,
Heretofore there was no human being dearer to me than thee; likewise hereafter there will be no one dearer to me than thee.
Love for thee, affection for thee—breath of all that is life—and they shall not come to an end so long as there lasts life.
III.
Thus did I always think: "I will live well, the whole of my life, with one lover: no force, no deceit."
The god Karma alone knew this thought of mine; so he provoked quarrel; he ripped out my heart from thee;
He led thee afar; tore me apart; made me partake in all sorrows and took away the consolation thou wast.

... mi life, spirit, and heart day-by-day...

Transliteration

II.

(...) Yaltse pikwala (...) watäṃ weṃt no

Mā ñi cisa noṣ śomo ñem wnolme lāre tāka mā ra postaṃ cisa lāre mäsketär-ñ.

Ciṣṣe laraumñe ciṣṣe ārtañye pelke kalttarr śolämpa ṣṣe mā te stālle śol-wärñai.

III.

Taiysu pälskanoym sanai ṣaryompa śāyau karttse-śaulu-wärñai snai tserekwa snai nāte.

Yāmor-ñīkte ṣe cau ñi palskāne śarsa tusa ysaly ersate ciṣy araś ñi sälkāte,

Wāya ci lauke tsyāra ñiś wetke klyautka-ñ pāke po läklentas ciṣe tsārwo, sampāte.

(...) Śaul palsk araśñi, kom kom

Inscription
(Tocharian script)

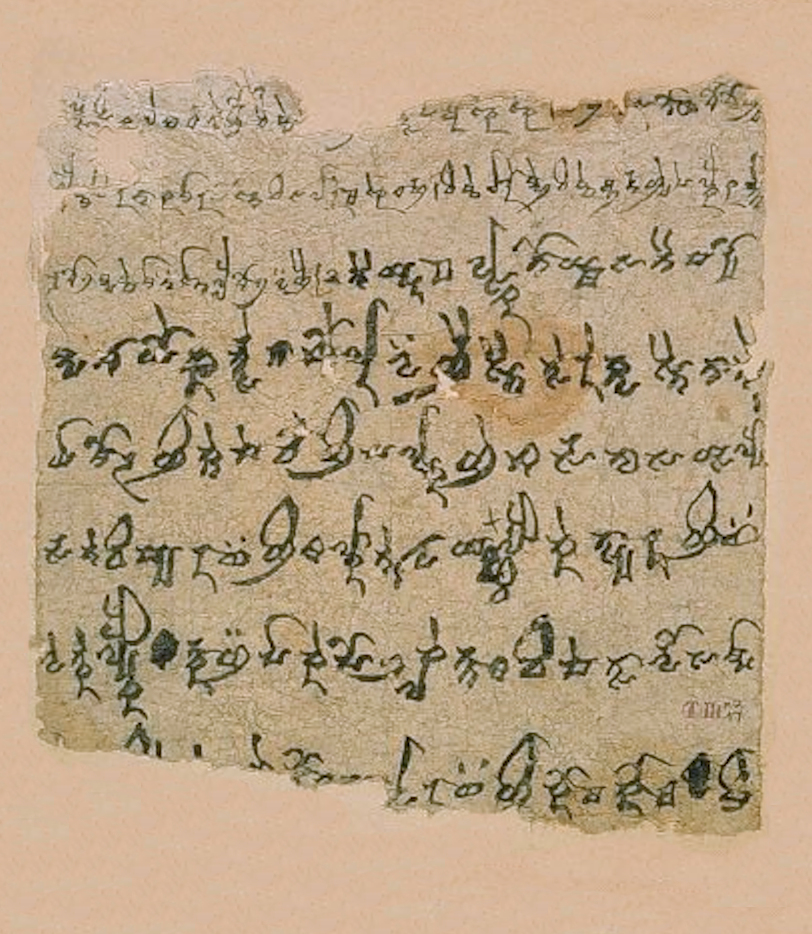
Tocharian B Love Poem, manuscript B496 (one of two fragments).

== Genetics ==
Tocharians are generally depicted with "red or blonde hair, long noses and blue or green eyes", and are thought to have spoken an Indo-European language (Tocharian). However, there is very little genomic data for the area in the 1st millennium AD. Two individuals dated 1880–1742 BP, found near modern Yuli in the northeastern Tarim, had haplogroup R1b.

== Known rulers ==
Names of the rulers of Kucha are known mainly from Chinese sources.

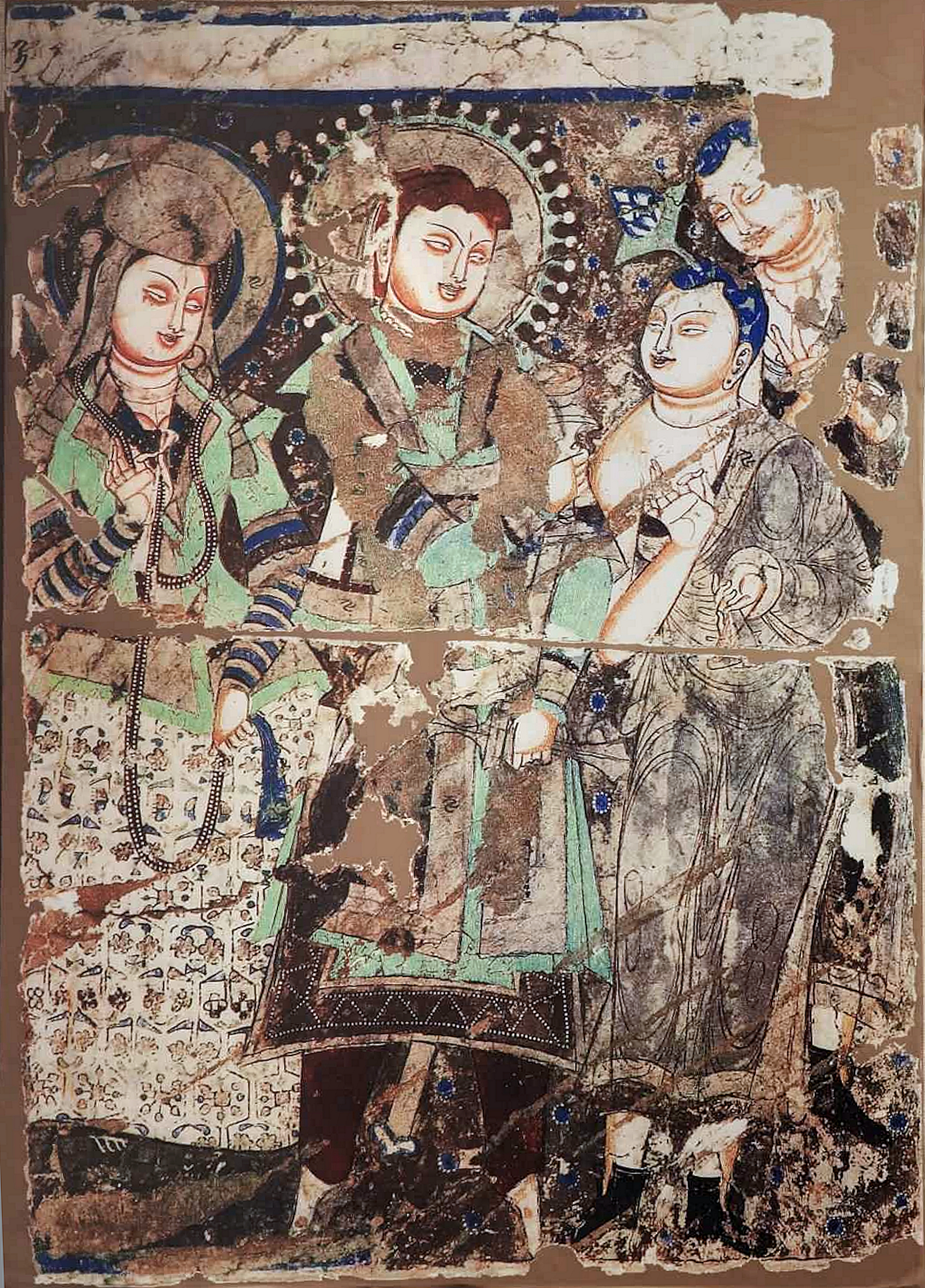
Prince Tottika, Kizil Cave 205.

- Hong (洪, 弘), circa 16 AD
- Chengde (丞德), circa 36 AD
- Zeluo (则罗), circa 46 AD
- Shen Du (身毒), circa 50 AD
- Bin (宾), circa 72 AD
- Jian (建), circa 73 AD
- Youliduo 尤利多, circa 76 AD
- Bai Ba (白霸), circa 91 AD
- Bai Ying(白英), circa 110-127 AD
- Bai Shan (白山), circa 280 AD
- Long Hui (龙会), circa 326 AD
- Bai Chun Chinese: 白纯 Baichun, ruled circa 383 AD
- Bai Zhen Chinese: 白震 Baizhen, ruled circa 383 AD
- Niruimo Zhunasheng Chinese: 尼瑞摩珠那胜 Niruimo Zhunasheng, ruled circa 520 AD
- Tottika (ruled in Kucha in the end of the 6th century), Chinese: 托提卡 Tuotika
- Bai Sunidie Chinese: 白苏尼咥 Bai Sunidie, circa 562 AD
- Suvarnapuspa (ruled in Kucha, 600-625 AD), Chinese: 白苏伐勃𫘝 Bai Sufaboshi
- Suvarnadeva (ruled in Kucha before 647), Chinese: 白蘇伐疊 Bai Sufadie
- Haripushpa (ruled in Kucha from 647), Chinese: 白訶黎布失畢 Bai Helibushibi
- Bai Yehu (白叶护)(648)
- Bai Helibushibi(白诃黎布失毕)650
- Bai Suji 白素稽 (659)
- Yan Tiandie 延田跌(678)
- Bai Mobi 白莫苾(708)
- Bai Xiaojie 白孝节(719)
- Bai Huan (ruled 731–789) Chinese: 白环, last ruler to be mentioned by Chinese sources.

== See also ==
- Bezeklik Thousand Buddha Caves
- List of Tocharian peoples
- Tocharian clothing
