= Tottika =

6th century king of Kucha

- King of Kucha
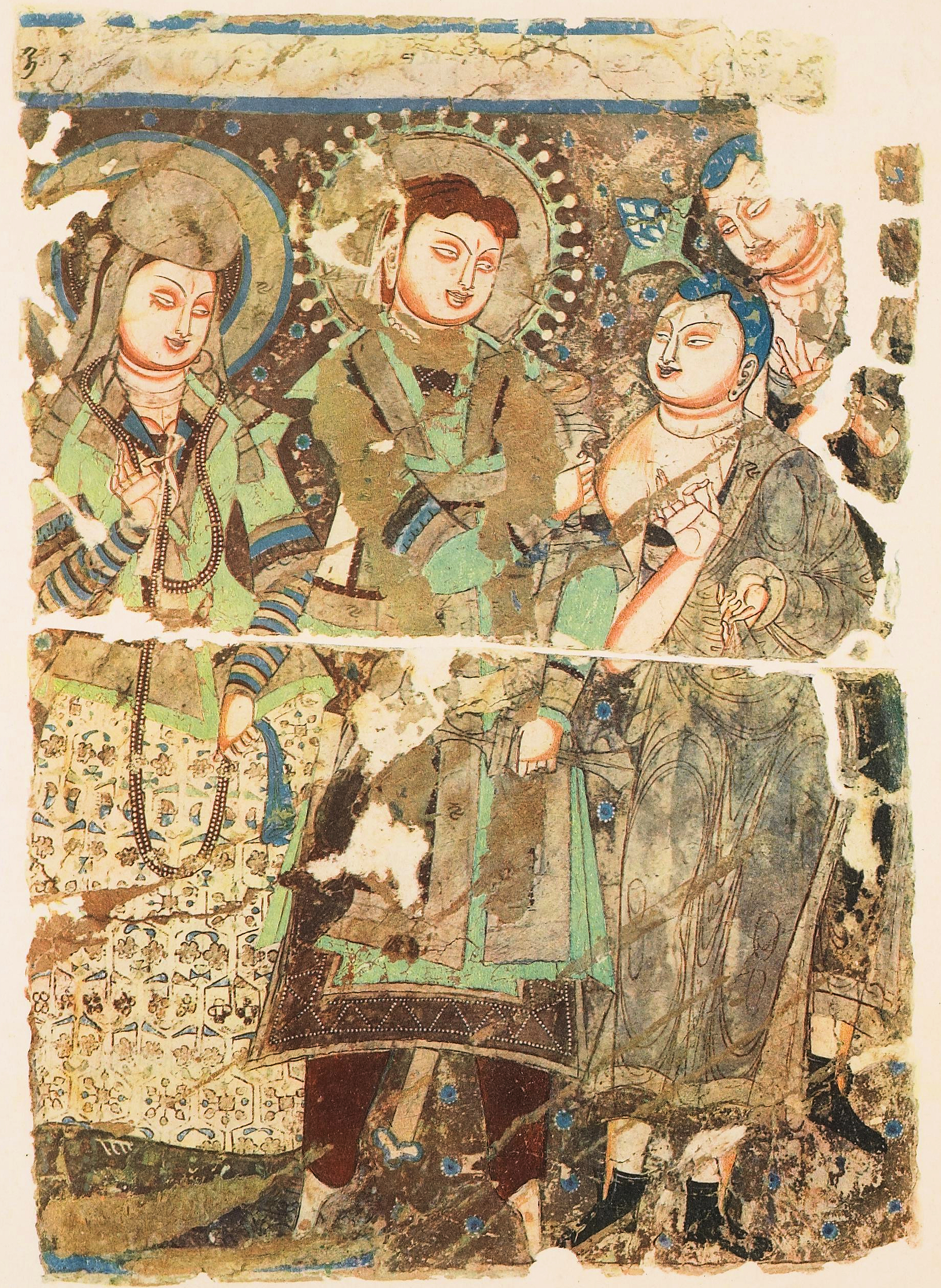
- King Tottika of Kucha with his wife Svayamprabhā, accompanied by two monks, Maya Cave (205), Kizil Caves
- Reign: 5??–600
- Born: c. 550
- Died: 600 (aged 49–50)
- Spouse: Svayaṃprabhā
- Religion: Kuchean Buddhism

Tottika (circa 550-600 CE) was a king of the Tarim Basin state of Kucha in the second half of the 6th century CE. He appears in a mural of the Maya Cave of the Kizil Caves, with his wife Svayamprabhā, accompanied by two monks and other attendants. The paintings were brought to Berlin by the Third Turfan expedition (1905-1907), but lost in World War II.

The murals of Maya Cave are generally thought to date to the 2nd half of the 6th century, after the 552 Turk conquest following their uprising against the Jou-Jan Qağanate.

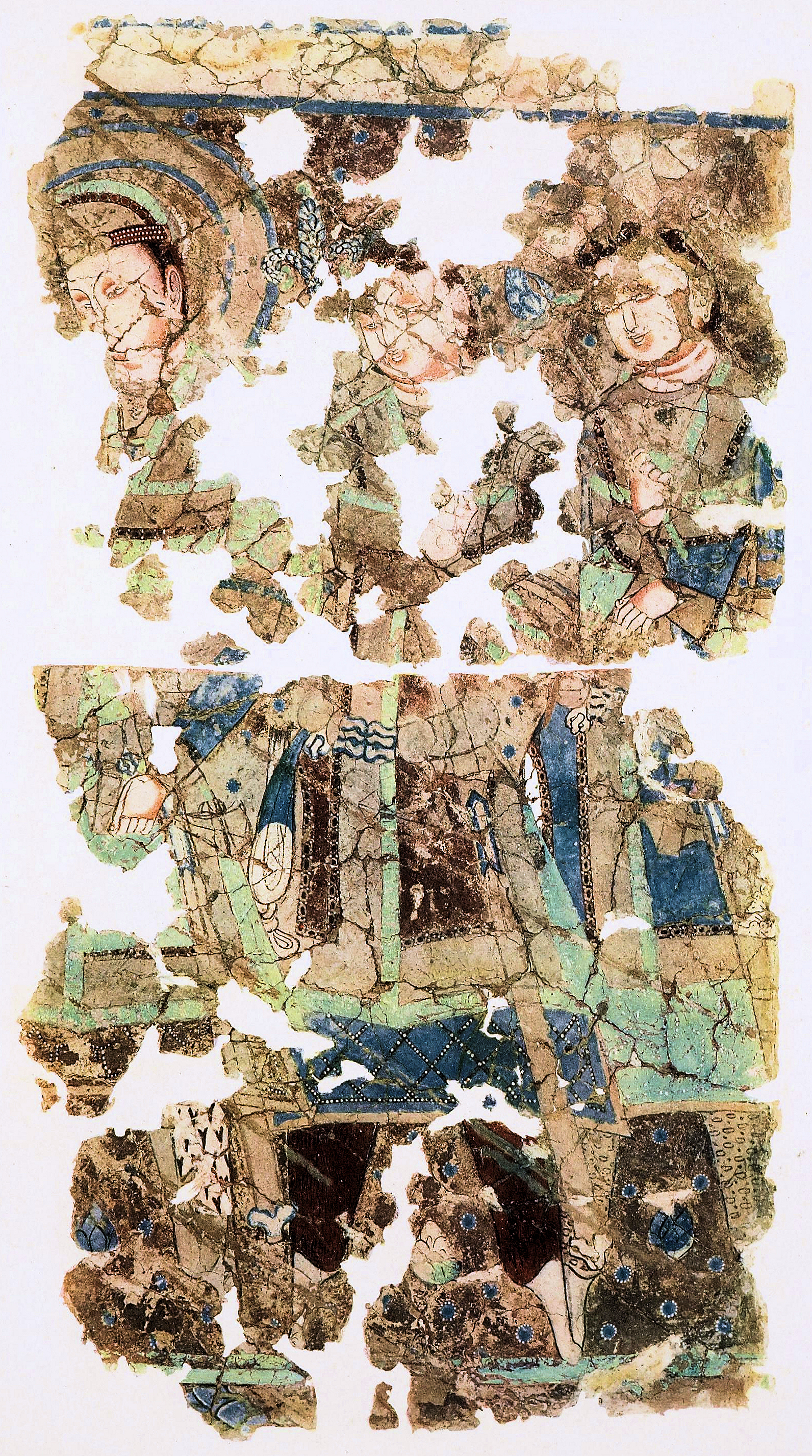
Armed attendants to King Anandavarman, Maya Cave (205)

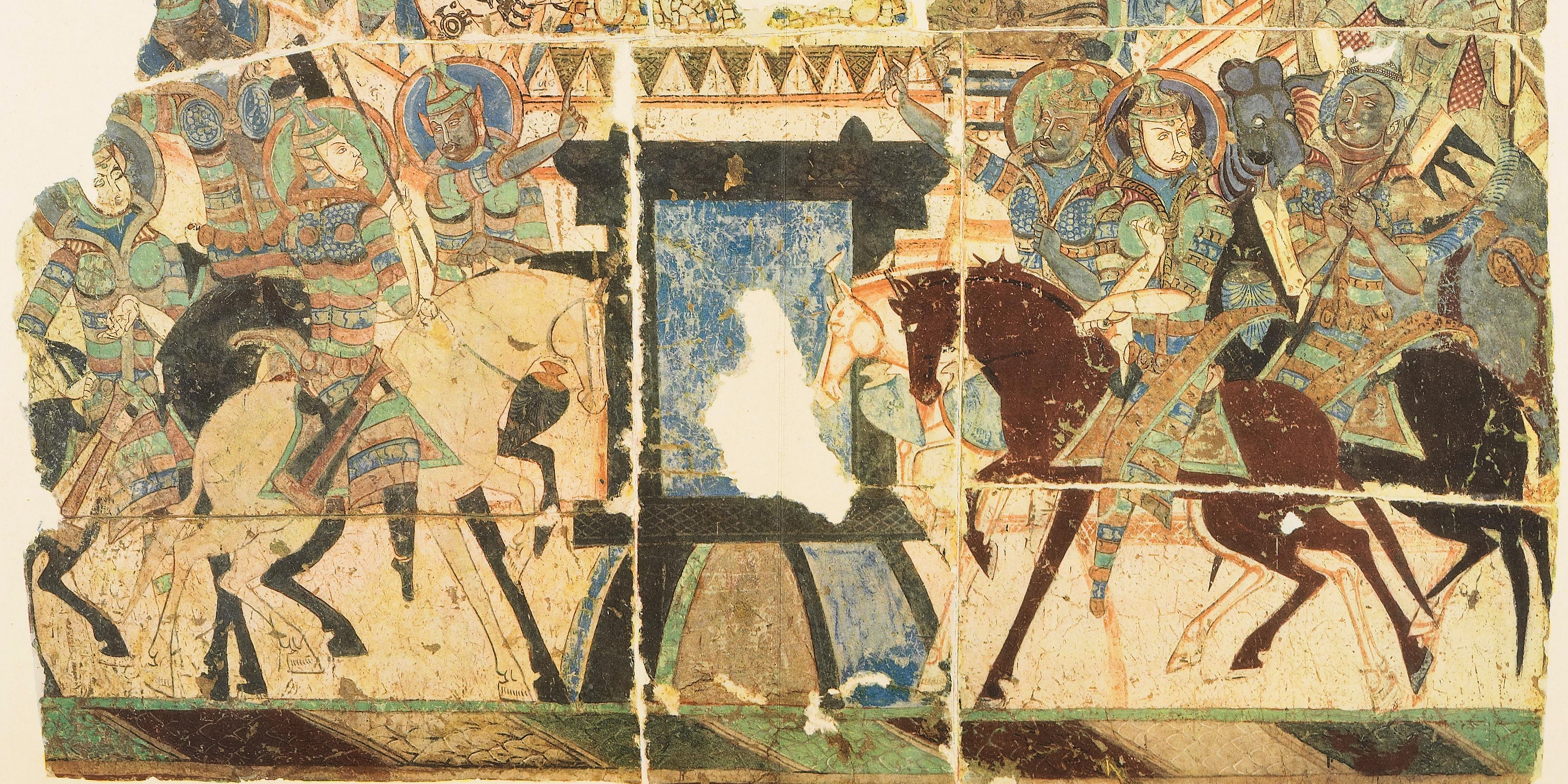
Cataphracts, Maya Cave (224). These follow the events of 552 CE and the subsequent Turk expansion. Kizil Caves, 2nd half of the 6th century CE.

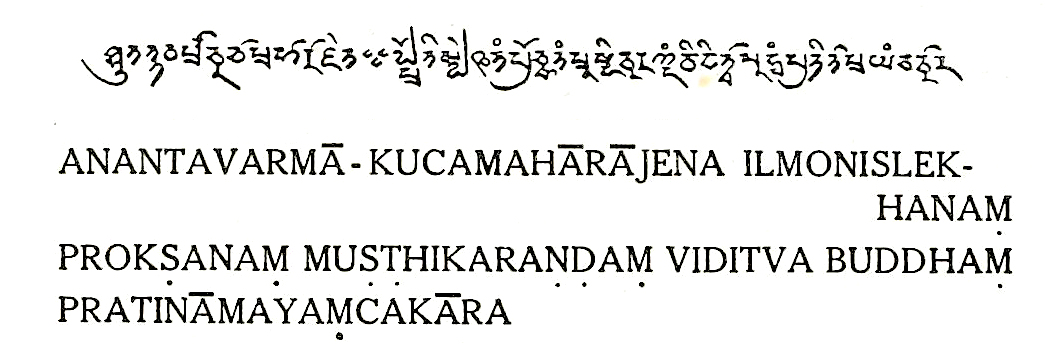
Inscription mentioning Anandavarman, found next to the mural of King Tottika.
