= Tocharian B =

Extinct Indo-European language in Asia

- Kuchean
- Kuśiññe
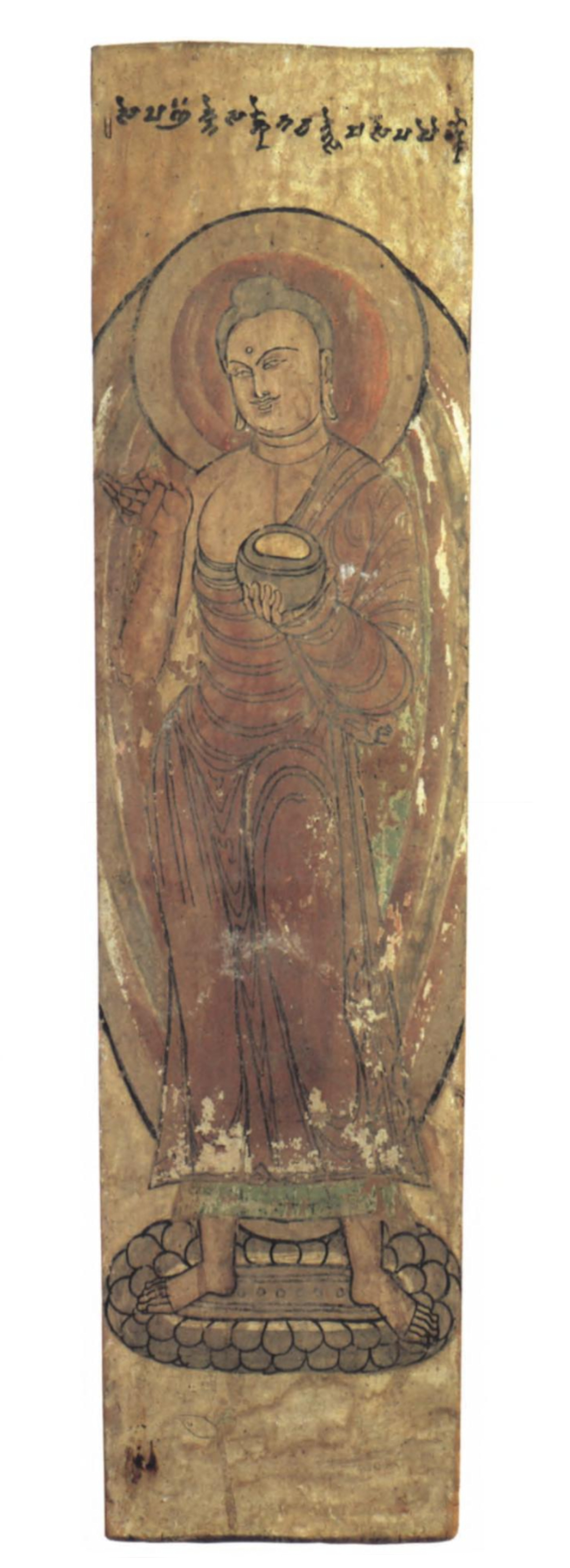
- Tocharian inscription "This Buddha was painted by the hand of Sanketava."
- Native to: Kucha
- Region: Tarim Basin
- Ethnicity: Tocharians
- Extinct: after 1178−1255
- Language family: Indo-European: Tocharian; Tocharian B
- Early form: Proto-Tocharian
- Writing system: Tocharian script; Manichaean script

Language codes
- ISO 639-3: txb
- Glottolog: tokh1243
- Tocharian languages A (blue), B (red) and C (green) in the Tarim Basin. Tarim oasis towns are given as listed in the Book of Han (c. 2nd century BC), with the areas of the squares proportional to population.

Tocharian B, also known as Kuchean or West Tocharian, was a Western member of the Tocharian branch of Indo-European languages, extinct from the ninth century. Once spoken in the Tarim Basin in Central Asia, Tocharian B shows an internal chronological development; three linguistic stages have been detected. The oldest stage is attested only in Kucha. There is also the middle ("classical"), and the late stage.

== Nomenclature ==
According to scholar Michael Peyrot, the self-designation for the language was kuśi 'Kuča'. In scholarly works, it is known as Tocharian B, sometimes referred to as West Tocharian or Kuchean.

== Overview ==
According to Peyrot, Tocharian B is dated between the 5th and 10th centuries AD, and was spread from Kuča to Yānqi and Turfan. Paul Widmer, following Tamai's and Adams's studies, situates Tocharian B roughly between 400 and 1200, its oldest layer dating from ca. 400 to 600, around "Kucha and environs", the youngest, a document from Xocho, designated B 296, carbon dated to 1178−1255 CE.

=== Documentation ===
According to J. H. W. Penney, Tocharian B is reported to be documented as Buddhist religious literature, and as secular material "pertaining to everyday life".

== Bibliography ==
Studies

- Penney, J. H. W. (2017). "74. The documentation of Tocharian". Handbook of Comparative and Historical Indo-European Linguistics. pp. 1298–1303. doi:10.1515/9783110523874-029. ISBN 978-3-11-052387-4.
- Peyrot, Michaël (2008). Variation and change in Tocharian B. doi:10.1163/9789004358218. ISBN 978-90-04-35821-8.
- Peyrot, Michaël. “Tocharian”. In: The Indo-European Language Family: A Phylogenetic Perspective. Edited by Thomas Olander. Cambridge: Cambridge University Press, 2022. pp. 83–101. doi:10.1017/9781108758666.006.
- Widmer, Paul (2017). "79. The dialectology of Tocharian". Handbook of Comparative and Historical Indo-European Linguistics (PDF). pp. 1389–1396. doi:10.1515/9783110523874-034. ISBN 978-3-11-052387-4.

Tocharian literature

- Lundysheva, Olga and Maue, Dieter. "An Old Uyghur text fragment related to the Tocharian B “History of Kuchean kings”". In: Religion and State in the Altaic World: Proceedings of the 62nd Annual Meeting of the Permanent International Altaistic Conference (PIAC), Friedensau, Germany, August 18–23, 2019. Edited by Oliver Corff, Berlin, Boston: De Gruyter, 2022, pp. 111-124. https://doi.org/10.1515/9783110730562-010
- Peyrot, Michaël; Wilkens, Jens (September 2014). "Two Tocharian B fragments parallel to the Hariścandra-Avadāna of the Old Uyghur Daśakarmapathāvadānamālā". Acta Orientalia Academiae Scientiarum Hungaricae. 67 (3): 319–335. doi:10.1556/aorient.67.2014.3.6. JSTOR 90004169.
- Wilkens, Jens; Pinault, Georges-Jean; Peyrot, Michaël (March 2014). "A tocharian B parallel to the legend of kalmāṣapāda and sutasoma of the old uyghur daśakarmapathāvadānamālā". Acta Orientalia Academiae Scientiarum Hungaricae. 67 (1): 1–18. doi:10.1556/aorient.67.2014.1.1. JSTOR 90004088.
- Mallory, J.P.; Mair, Victor H. (2000), The Tarim Mummies, London: Thames & Hudson, ISBN 0-500-05101-1.
