= Paula DePriest =

American lichenologist

- Born: 1957 (age 68–69)
- Education: Union University (B.S.); University of Tennessee (M.S.); Duke University (Ph.D.)
- Awards: Fellow of the American Association for the Advancement of Science
- Scientific career
- Fields: lichenology
- Workplaces: National Museum of Natural History; Smithsonian Institution; Smithsonian Museum Conservation Institute
- Author abbrev. (botany): DePriest

Paula DePriest is an American lichenologist and specialist in artifact conservation. She has been curator of the lichen collection at the National Museum of Natural History, USA and deputy director of the Smithsonian's Museum Conservation Institute.

== Early life and education ==
Paula Teresa DePriest studied at Union University, completing her bachelor's degree in 1978 and then moved to the University of Tennessee for a master's degree in botany in 1983. She undertook doctoral research at Duke University and was awarded a PhD degree in 1992.

== Career ==
She initially worked at the National Museum of Natural History in Washington, USA and was appointed the curator of the lichen collection. Later in her career she was scientific advisor in the Office of the Under Secretary for Science at the Smithsonian Institution and then deputy director of the Smithsonian's Museum Conservation Institute. She has also held posts as adjunct professor at Duke University (1997–2004) and George Mason University (1998–2004).

Her research focuses on lichens, particularly the phylogenetic and cultural relationships of those used as forage in reindeer herding regions of Mongolia, the Cladoniaceae. She also studies the deterioration of outdoor sculpture and monuments that can be caused by fungi and lichens. She worked on a project preserving deer stones in collaboration with the Mongolian Academy of Sciences. Her work has identified or clarified the status of several lichens, including Flavoparmelia leucoxantha, Hypotrachyna quaesita, Punctelia dictyoidea and Punctelia roystoneae.

Outside of Mongolia, she has traveled throughout Europe, Scandinavia, and Central and South America while doing fieldwork. She studied lichen southeast of the Appalachians in the United States during her early career.

The lichen Bacidia depriestiana was named in her honor in 2019.

== Publications ==
DePriest is the author or co-author of over 90 scientific publications and book chapters. The most significant include:

- Weaver, Jamie L., DePriest, Paula T., Plymale, Andrew E., Pearce, Carolyn I., Arey, Bruce, and Koestler, Robert J. 2021. Microbial interactions with silicate glasses. npj Materials Degradation 5:Article 11.
- DePriest, Paula T., Fitxzhugh, William W., Beaubien, Harriet F., and Bayarsaikhan, Jamsranjav. 2014. Research and Preservation of Mongolia's Cultural Heritage. Arctic Studies Center Newsletter (21): 14–17.
- Solazzo, Caroline, Heald, Susan, Ballard, Mary W., Ashford, David A., DePriest, Paula T., Koestler, Robert J., and Collins, Matthew. 2011. Proteomics and Coast Salish blankets: a tale of shaggy dogs? Antiquity 85:1418-1432.
- Ahti, T. & DePriest, P.T. 2001. New combinations of Cladina epithets in Cladonia (Ascomycotina: Parmeliaceae). Mycotaxon 78:499–502.
