= Bacidia depriestiana =

Scientific classification
- Kingdom: Fungi
- Division: Ascomycota
- Class: Lecanoromycetes
- Order: Lecanorales
- Family: Ramalinaceae
- Genus: Bacidia
- Species: B. depriestiana

Binomial name
- Bacidia depriestiana Lendemer & Keepers (2021)

Species of lichen-forming fungus

Bacidia depriestiana is a species of lichen-forming fungus in the family Ramalinaceae. It is a sorediate crustose lichen that grows on the bark of white oak along forested stream banks on steep slopes in the Southern Appalachian Mountains in the United States.

== Taxoomy ==
Bacidia depriestiana was described as a new species by James Lendemer and Kyle Keepers in 2021. The holotype specimen was collected by Lendemer on October 12, 2016 from a south-facing slope in the Nantahala National Forest, North Carolina. The specimen (NY-03033306) was found growing on the bark of white oak (Quercus alba) in a mixed hardwood forest dominated by maple (Acer), hickory (Carya), black gum (Nyssa), and oak (Quercus) species, with eastern white pine (Pinus strobus) and an understory of rhododendron and mountain laurel (Kalmia); the collection site was located at an elevation of 3,250 ft (990 m). The species epithet, depriestiana, honors Paula DePriest, for her research contributions to Appalachian lichen biodiversity knowledge.

== Description ==
Bacidia depriestiana has a yellowish-grey thallus, broken up into minute areoles that are often topped are topped irregular balls of grainy blue-gray soredia. Since it reproduces asexually, chemistry is important for identifying it; it produces zeorin and atranorin.

== Distribution ==
Bacidia depriestiana grows on the bark of white oak (Quercus alba) along forested stream banks on steep slopes in the Southern Appalachian Mountains in the United States. As of its original publication, it had been documented from three locations: in Tennessee, North Carolina, and South Carolina.
