= Deer stones culture =

Megaliths found largely in Siberia and Mongolia

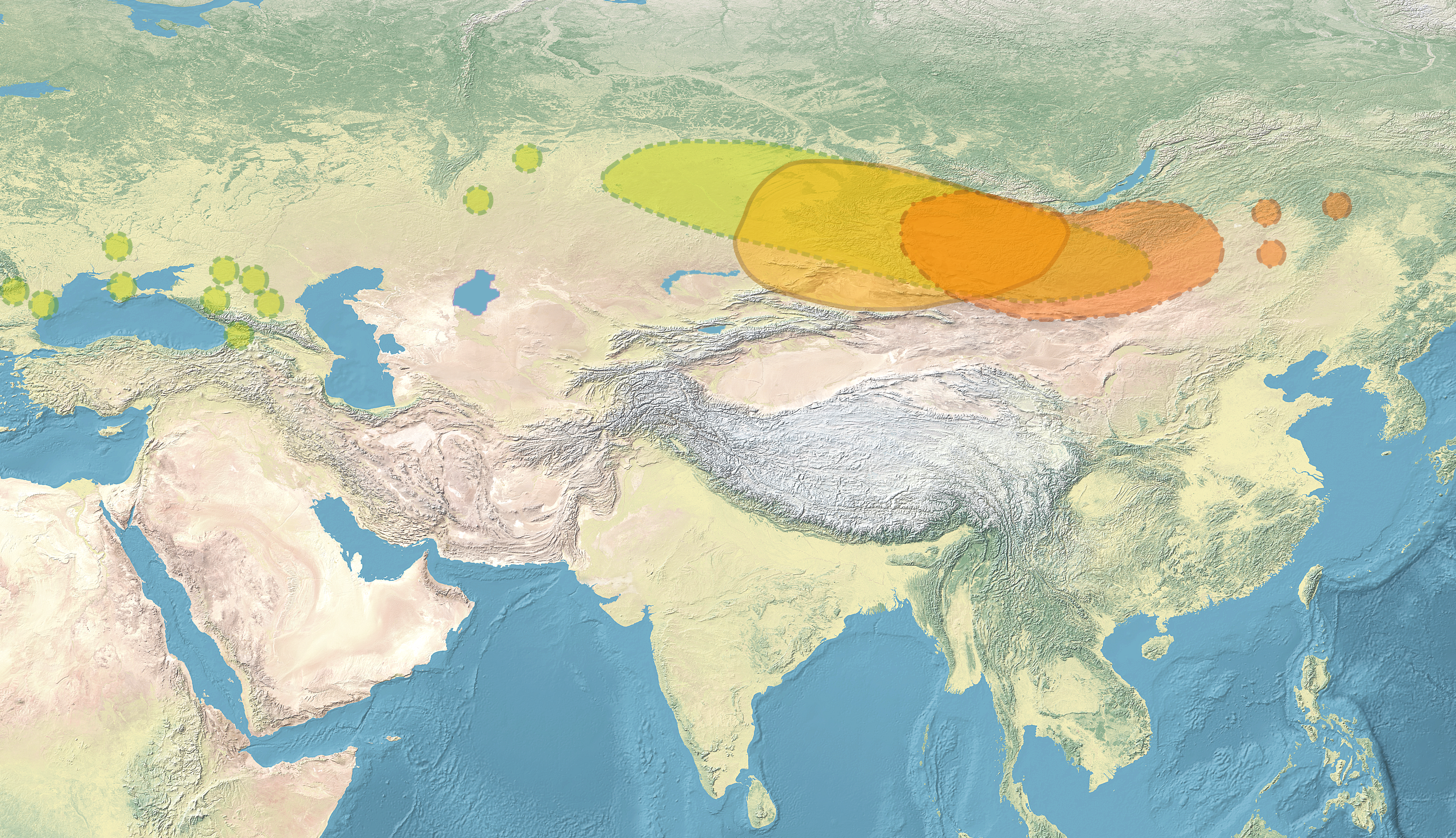
- General location of the Deer stones, and contemporary Asian polities c. 1000 BCE. : Type I, : Type II, : Type III, and scattered individual finds. The three types can be found together in the area of western Mongolia.
- Geographical range: South Siberia, western Mongolia
- Period: Bronze Age, Early Iron Age
- Dates: 1400 — 700 BCE
- Preceded by: Afanasievo culture Chemurchek culture Munkhkhairkhan culture Sagsai culture
- Followed by: West: Arzhan, Chandman, Pazyryk culture East: Slab-grave culture

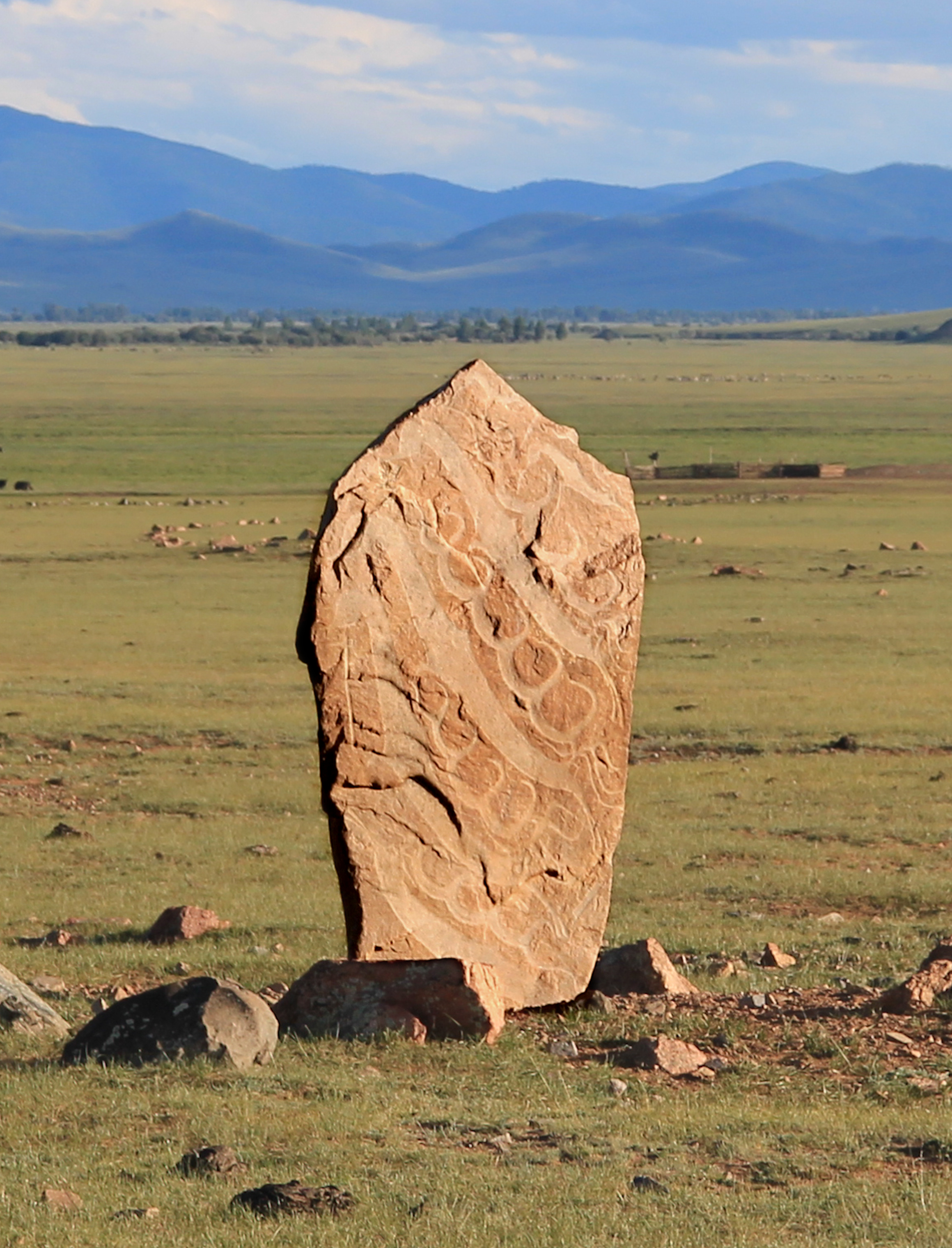
Tsatsyn Denj deerstone, near the Tamir River (47.750743°N 101.371529°E), Arkhangai Province, Mongolia

Deer stones (Mongolian: Буган чулуун хөшөө), sometimes called the Deer stone-khirigsuur complex (DSKC), in reference to neighbouring khirigsuur tombs, are ancient megaliths carved with symbols found mainly in Mongolia and, to a lesser extent, in the adjacent areas in Siberia. 1,300 of the 1,500 deer stones found so far are located in Mongolia. The name comes from their carved depictions of flying deer. The "deer stones culture" relates to the lives and technologies of the late Bronze Age peoples associated with the deer stone complexes, as informed by archaeological finds, genetics, and the content of deer stone art.

The deer stones are part of a pastoral tradition of stone burial mounds and monumental constructions that appeared in Mongolia and neighbouring regions during the Bronze Age (c. 3000–700 BCE). Various cultures occupied the area during this period and contributed to monumental stone constructions, starting with the Afanasievo culture and continuing with the Okunev, Chemurchek, Munkhkhairkhan, or Ulaanzuukh traditions. The deer stones themselves belong to one of the latest traditions of monumental stones, from circa 1400 to 700 BCE (Late Bronze Age to Early Iron Age), but precede the Slab grave culture. The deer stones also immediately precede, and are often connected to, the early stages of the Saka culture (particularly the Arzhan, Chandman, and Pazyryk cultures) in the area from the Altai to Western Mongolia. Deer stone art is earlier than the earliest Scythian sites such as Arzhan by 300 to 500 years and is considered as pre- or possibly proto-Scythian.

The deer stone culture seems to have been influenced by the contemporary Karasuk culture to the northwest, with which it shares characteristics, particularly in the area of weapon metallurgy.

== Construction ==
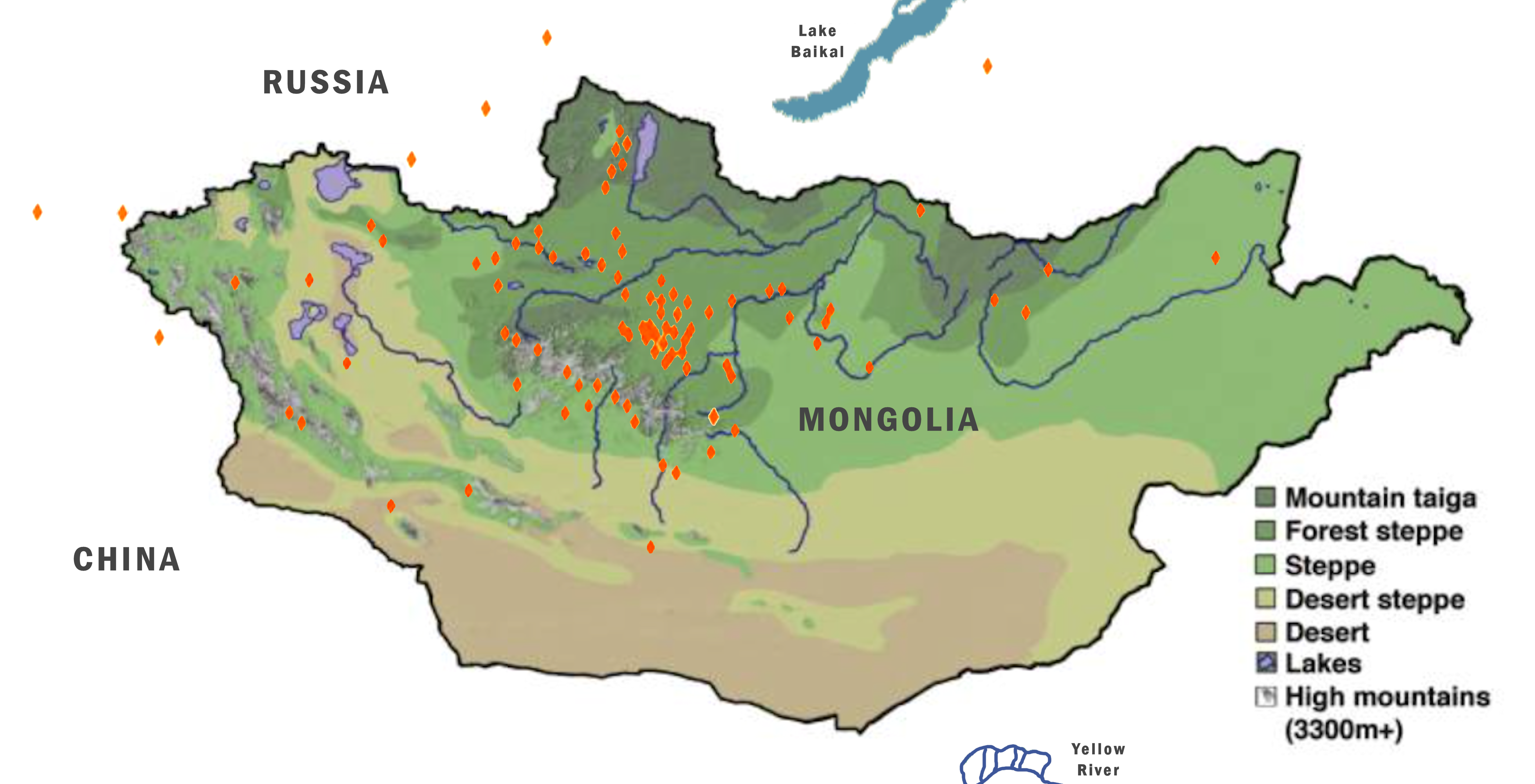
Deer stones are generally located in the most productive, well-watered areas of the northern Mongolian steppe.

Although Mongolia is globally quite arid, deer stones are generally located in the most productive, well-watered areas of the northern Mongolian steppe, particularly in the north and the west of the country, where most of Mongolia's cultural development has always taken place.

In Mongolia, deer stones are generally associated with khirigsuur burial mounds, and seem to be part of an integrated Late Bronze Age mortuary ceremonial dating to ca. 1200-700 BCE. The amount of work necessary to build such numerous and massive stone structures suggests a complex hierarchical society, which appears for the first time in the steppes of Mongolia, but became the foundation for later nomadic states and empires. The graves are quite shallow, so that human remains are poorly preserved, and artifacts are few to inexistent.

Deer stones are usually constructed from granite or greenstone, depending on which is the most abundant in the surrounding area. They have varying heights; most are over 3 feet (0.9 m) tall, but some reach a height of 15 feet (4.6 m). The tops of the stones can be flat, round or smashed, suggesting that perhaps the original top had been deliberately destroyed. The stones usually have their "face" oriented towards the east.

The carvings and designs were usually completed before the stone was erected, though some stones show signs of being carved in place. The designs were pecked or ground into the stone surface. Deep-grooved cuts and right-angle surfaces indicate the presence of metal tools. Stone tools were used to smooth the harsh cuts of some designs. Nearly all the stones were hand carved, but some unusual stones show signs that they could have been cut with a primitive type of mechanical drill.

=== Distribution ===
Archaeologists have found more than 1,500 deer stones in Eurasia. Over 1,300 of them were recorded in the territory of modern Mongolia. A few more scattered deer stones are found in a wider area, in Xinjiang, and as far west as Kuban, Russia; the Southern Bug in Ukraine; Dobruja, Bulgaria; and the Elbe, which flows through the Czech Republic and Germany.

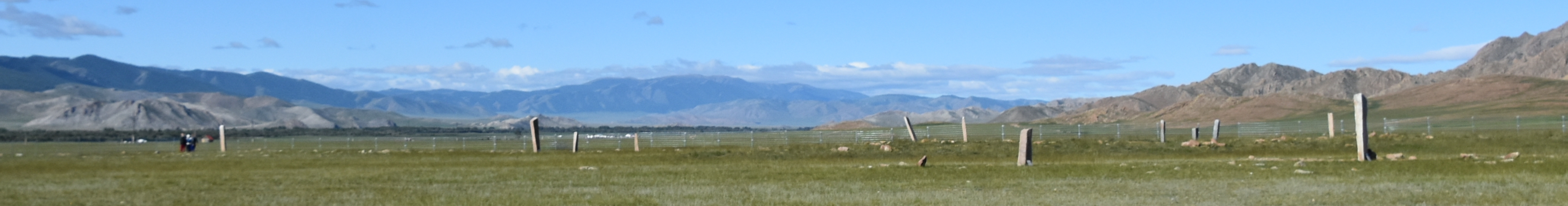
Deer stones in their environment. Uushiggin Uveer Bronze Age site near Mörön, northern Mongolia

== Types of stones ==
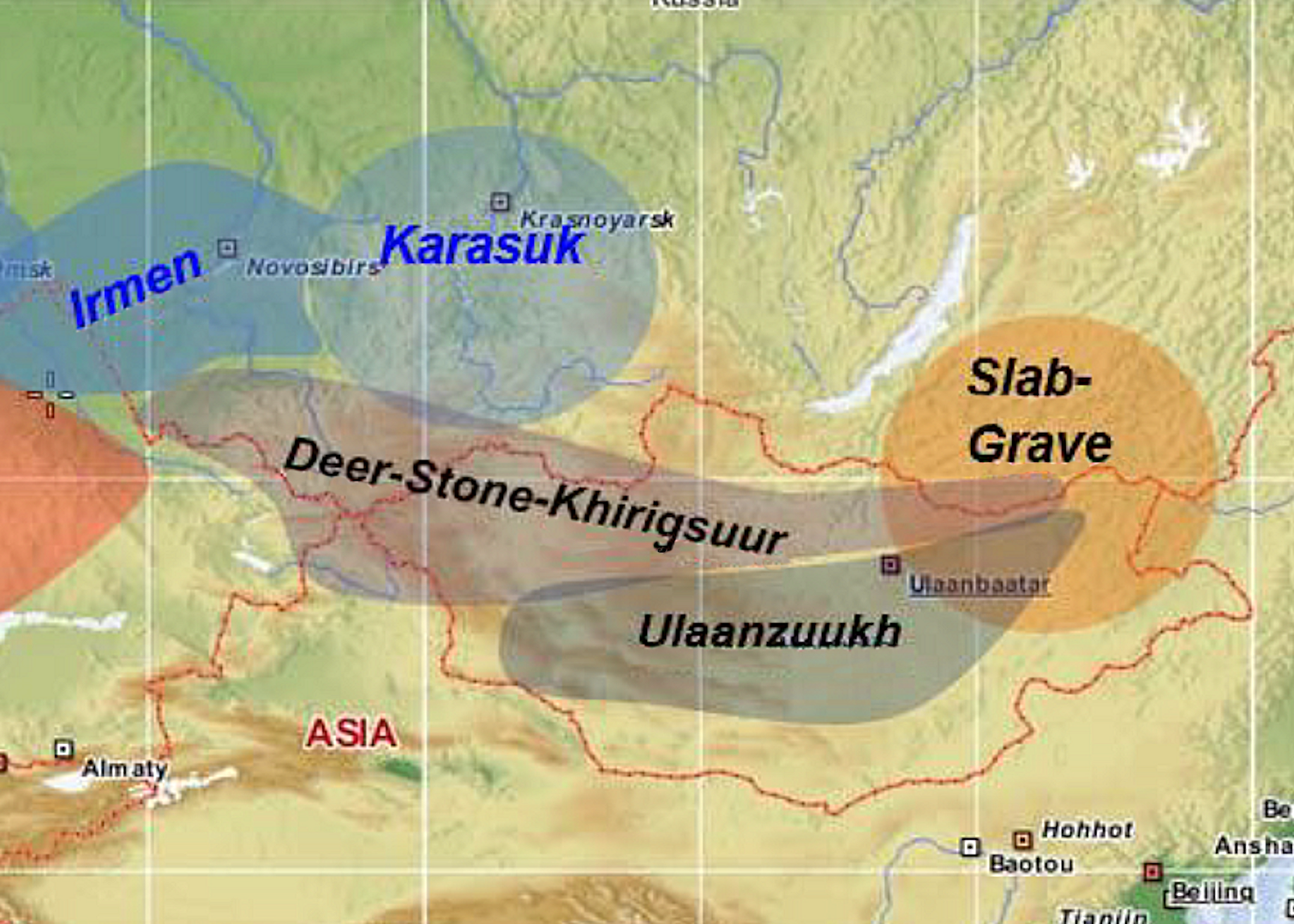
Deer stones culture map.

Deer stones do not have any human remains attached to them, although Khirigsuur tombs are often found in somewhat close proximity in Mongolia. This suggests that the tombs functioned as cenotaph monuments for departed leaders, and that the bodies were buried elsewhere.

There is no apparent evolutionary chronology for the design of the deer stones, which suggests an earlier and rather accomplished tradition already existed, probably on a perishable material such as wood. Stone probably started being used when metal tools became available. There is also no clear difference of chronology between the different types of deer stones (types I, II and III), which also often occur at the same places. Some of the simpler designs, such as the Saian-Altai stones (Type II) are actually dated among the oldest deer stones (1300 BCE), together with the Mongolian designs (Type I).

Most deer stones originally had an anthropomorphic intent, suggested by the general "pillar" shape, and reliefs or drawings depicting a belt loaded with tools and weapons, a shield in the stone's back, jewelry such as a necklace, earrings, and a symbolic or, rarely, a realistic face, sometimes topped with a hat. The front, if undisturbed, is always oriented towards the east.

The stylistic "flying deer" on the surface of many deer stones may not just be decorative designs, but may actually represent the body tattoos of the specific individuals being depicted. This hypotheses has been reinforced by the discovery of extensive body tattoos of "flying deer" on the skin of individuals from the Pazyryk culture. Deer stones may just be a schematical but complete representation of the tattooed body of the deceased, together with his tools and weapons.

Looking at the various implement and tools depicted on the deer stones, such as the horse implements, the recurved bow and the gorytus, it appears that the people who raised the stone were fully dependent on the horse for their lifestyles and warfare.

V. V. Volkov, in his thirty years of research, classified three distinct types of deer stones.

=== Type I: Classic Mongolian ===
These stones are fairly detailed and more elegant in their depiction methods. They usually feature a belted warrior with a stylized flying red deer on his torso. This type of stone is most prominent in southern Siberia and northern Mongolia. This concentration suggests that these stones were the origin of the deer stone tradition, and further types both simplified and elaborated on these. These deer stone are often associated with "Khirgisuur" burials. These Khirgisuur burial sites belong to an earlier archaeological period, but were appropriated by deer stone builders.

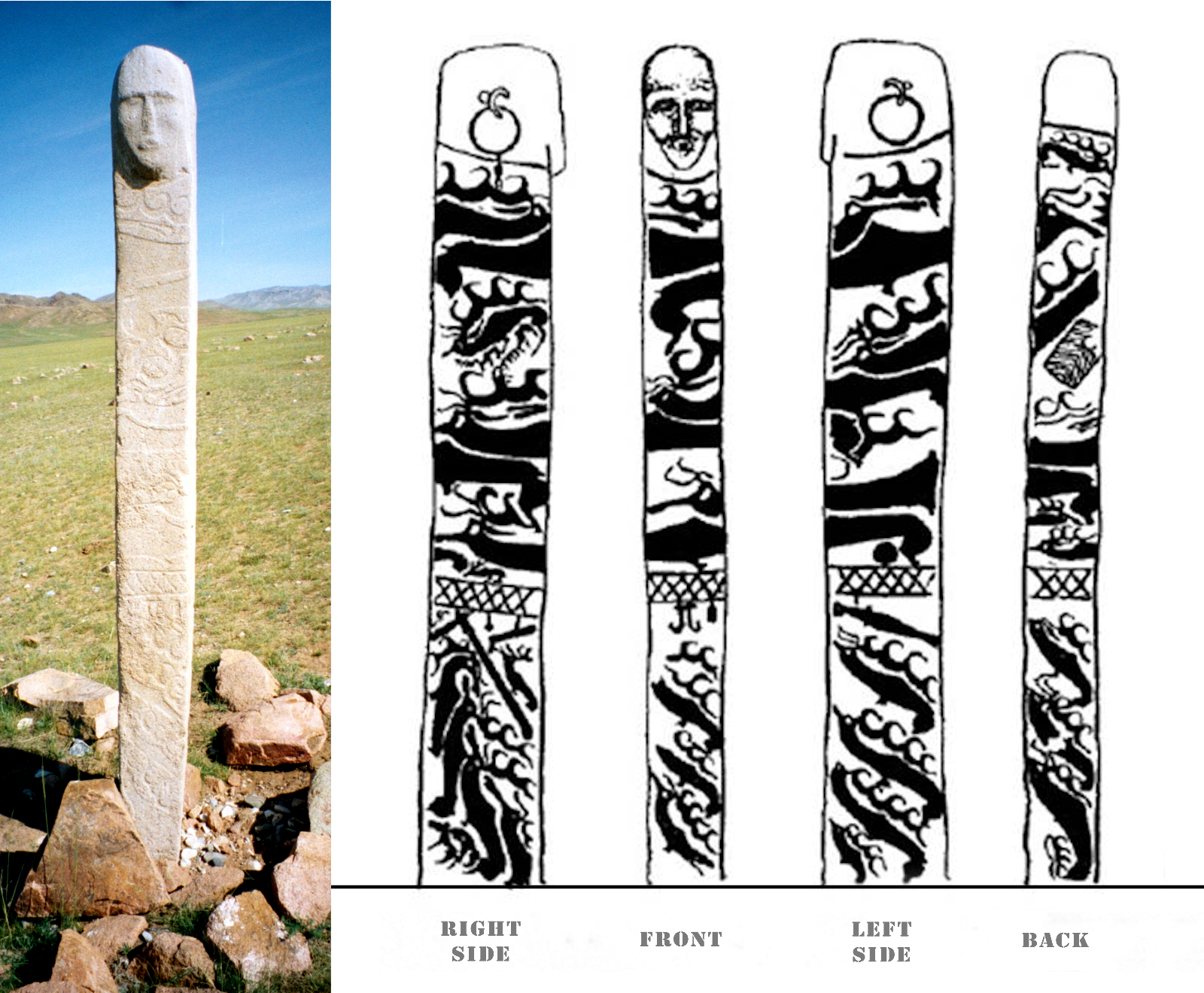
Type I: Classic Mongolian (Uushigiin Övör site, Deer Stone 14), with its four sides.

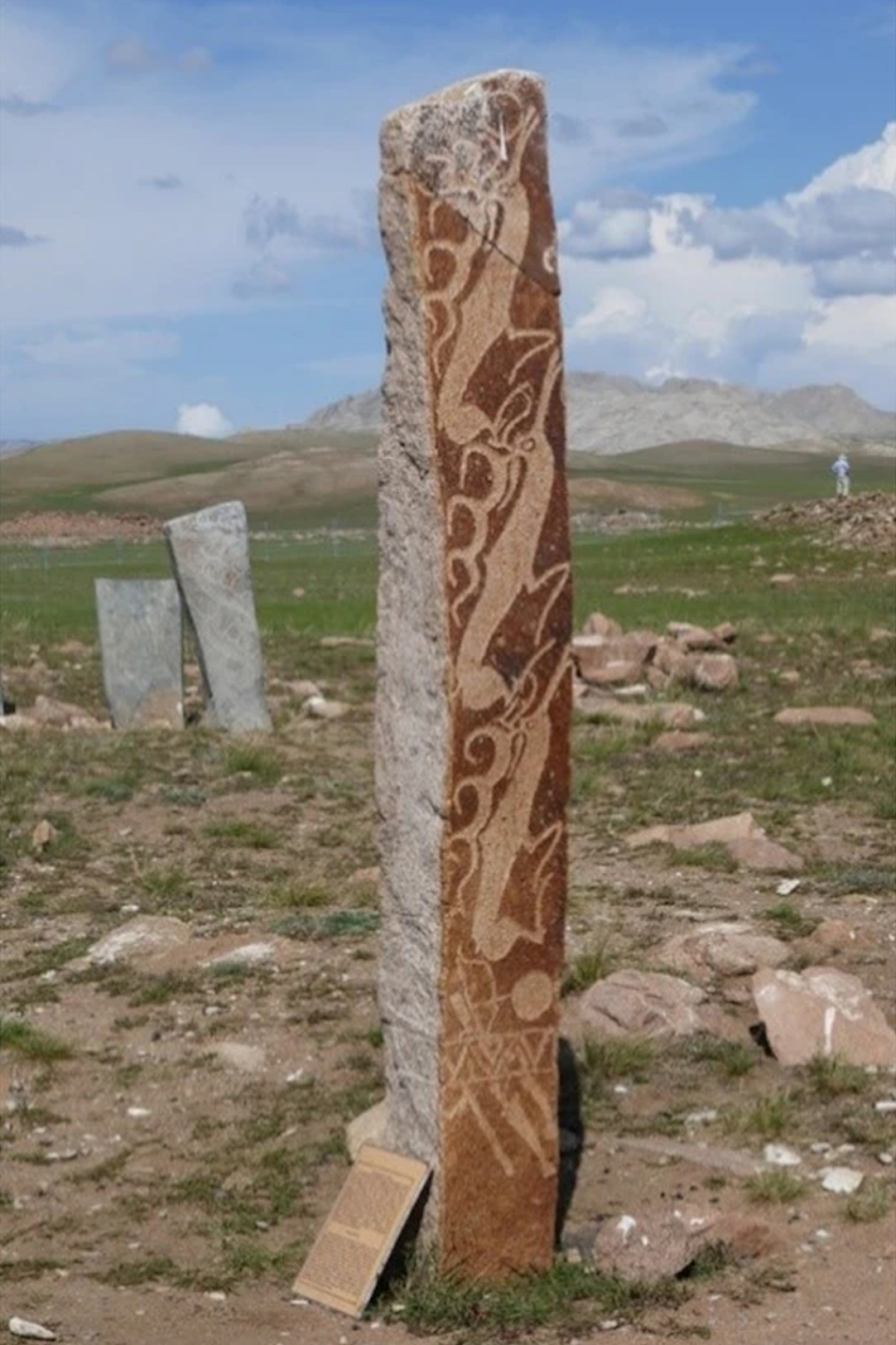
Deer stone, Khövsgöl Province, Mongolia

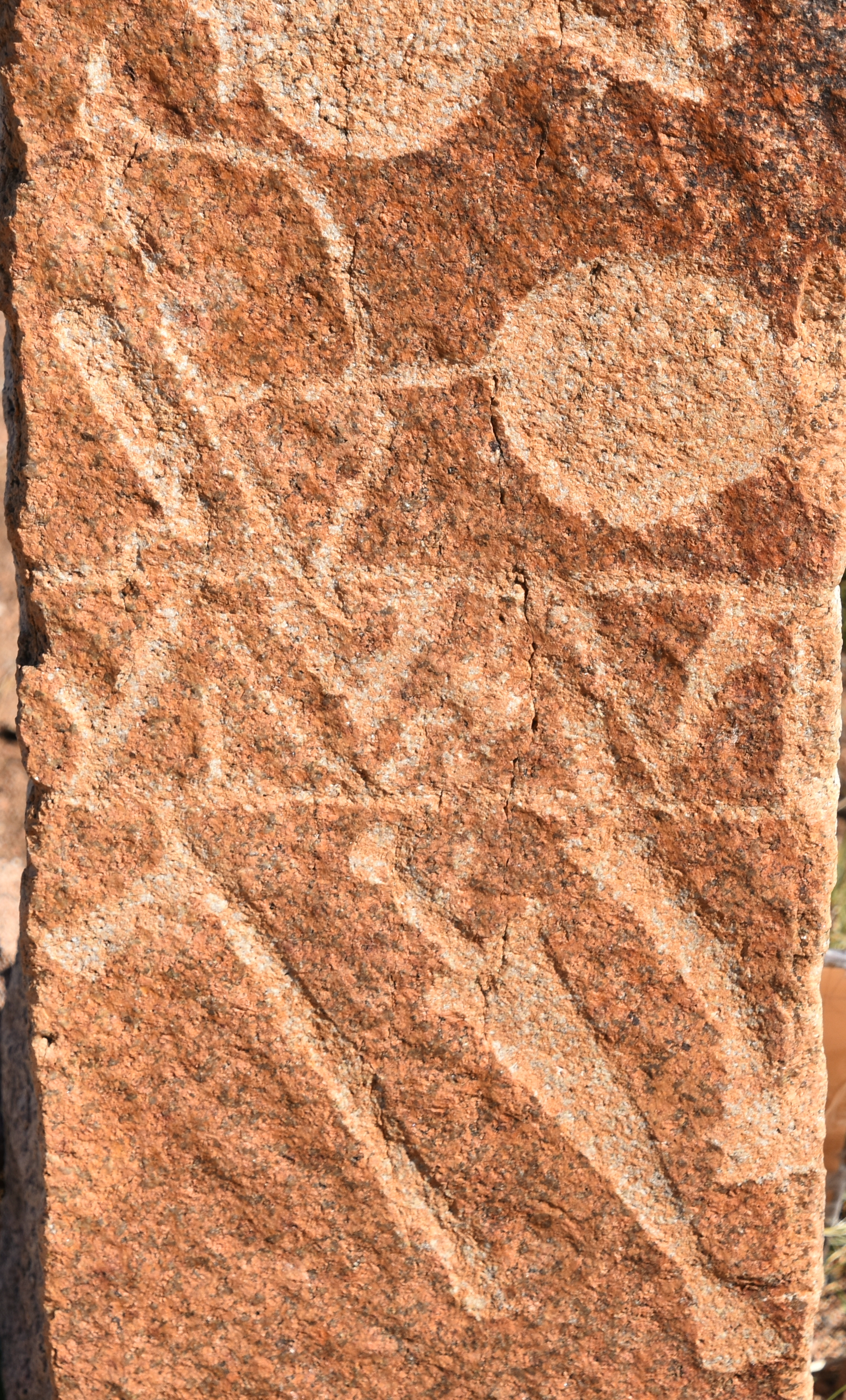
Close-up of the weapons at the bottom of the Khövsgöl deer stone

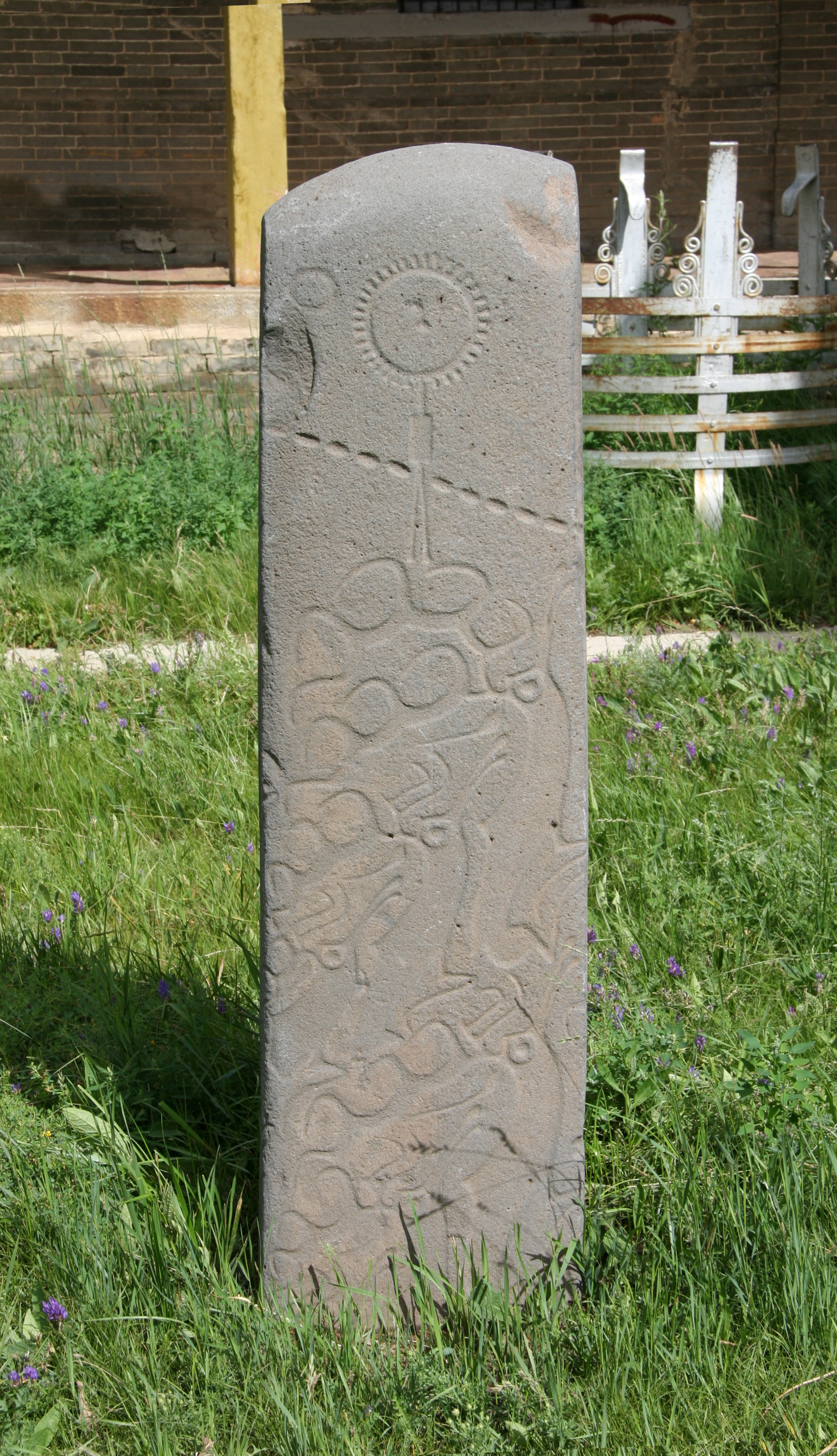
Deer stone with flying deer, a Type I characteristic. Ulaan Batur

=== Type II: Sayan-Altai ===
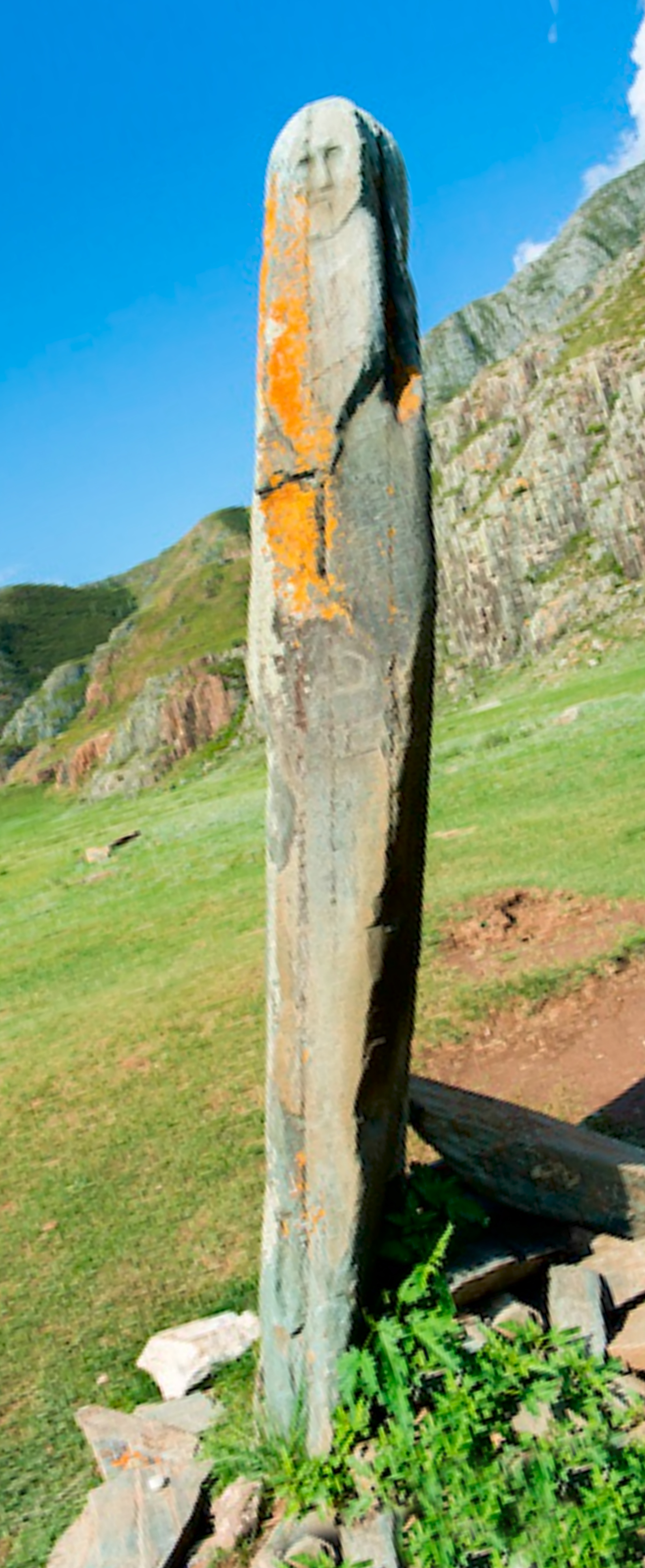
An anthropomorphic deer-stone in Adyr-kan, central Altai, Russia.

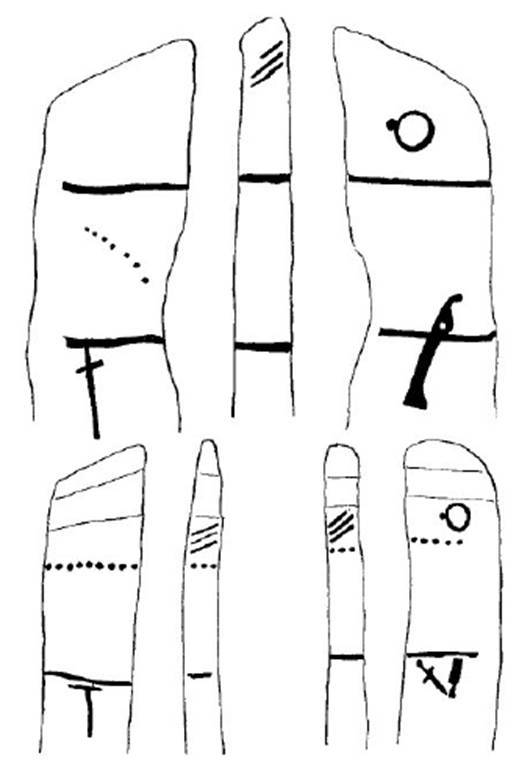
Type III: Eurasian type

The Sayan-Altai stones feature some of the West Asian-European markings, including free-floating, straight-legged animals, daggers and other tools. The appearance of deer motifs is markedly diminished, and those that do appear often do not emphasise the relationship between reindeer and flying. The Sayan-Altai stones can be sub-divided into two types:

- The Gorno-Altai stones have simple warrior motifs, displaying tools in the belt region of the stone. Reindeer motifs appear but are few. The deer stones of the Altai are regularly associated with the early Scythian Pazyryk culture.
- The Sayan-Tuva stones are similar to the Gorno-Altai but contain fewer images of animals. No deer motifs are present. The artistic style is much simpler, often consisting of only belts, necklaces, earrings and faces. In Tuva, deer stones are associated with the wealthy Saka burials of Arzhan 1 and Arzhan 2.
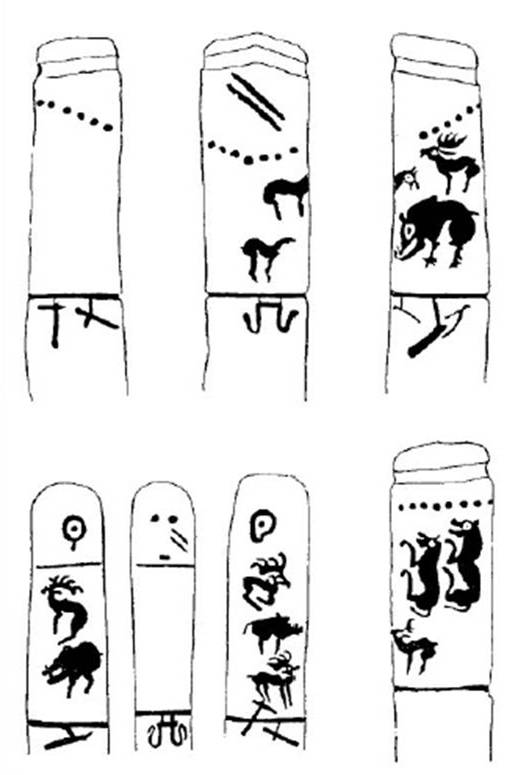
Type II: Sayan-Altai type

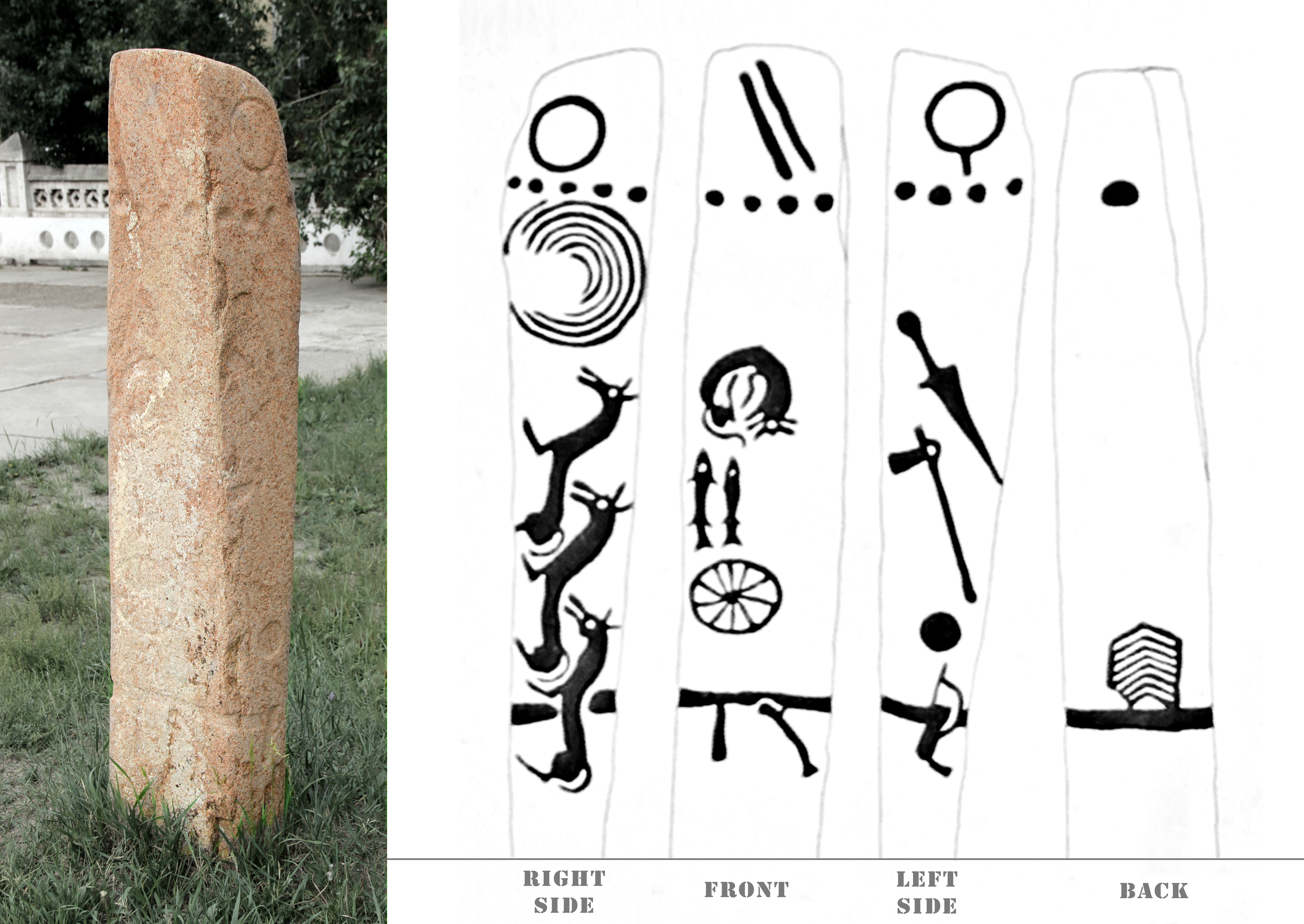
Sayan-Altai Deer stone with its four sides, Surtiin Denj, Bürentogtokh, Khövsgöl. National Museum of Mongolia

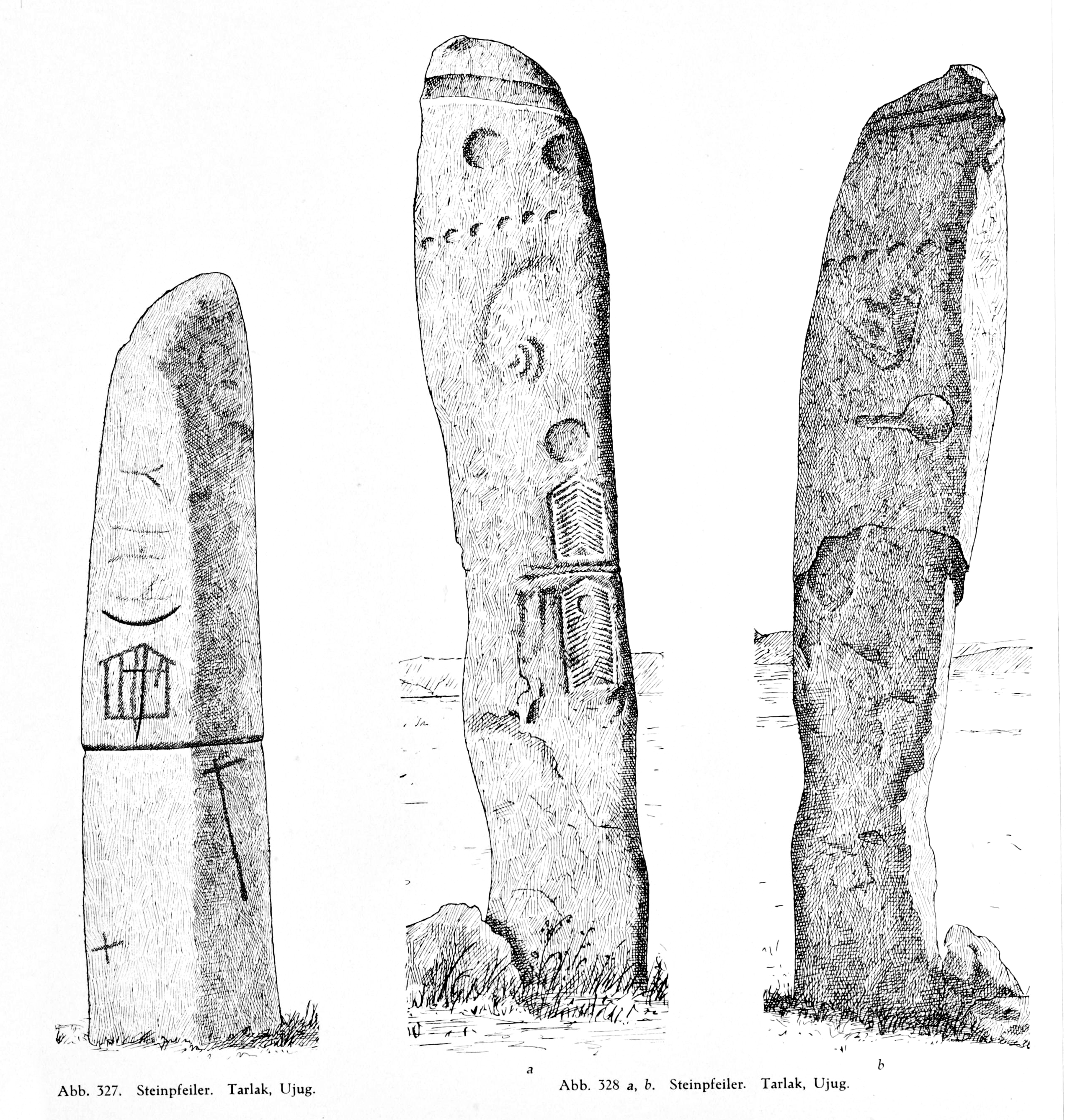
A Sayan-Tuva deer stone in Uyuk-Tarlak, Tuva, Russia

=== Type III: West Eurasian ===
These stones feature a central region of the stone, sectioned off by two horizontal lines or "belts". There are also "earring hoops", large circles, diagonal slashes in groups of two and three known as "faces", and "necklaces", collection of stone pits resembling their namesake. A few monuments classified as "deer stones" have been found as far as the Ural, Crimea or even the Elbe river, in a Scythian context (600-300 BCE).

== Imagery ==
There are many common images that appear in deer stones, as well as a multitude of ways they are presented.

=== Reindeer ===
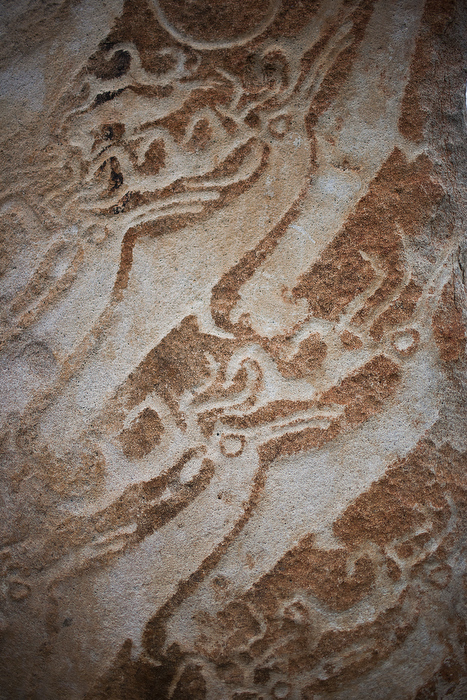
Mongolian Deer stone motif.

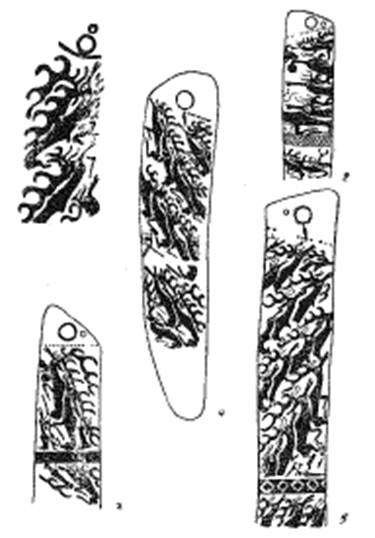
Different applications of ornate antler detailing

Deer feature prominently in nearly all of the deer stones. They are likely the red deer or maral (Cervus elaphus sibericus). Early stones have very simple images of reindeer, and as time progresses, the designs increase in detail. A gap of 500 years results in the appearance of the complicated flying reindeer depiction. Reindeer are depicted as flying through the air, rather than merely running on land. The anthropologist Piers Vitebsky has written, "The reindeer is depicted with its neck outstretched and its legs flung out fore and aft, as if not merely galloping but leaping through the air." The antlers, sometimes appearing in pairs, have become extremely ornate, utilizing vast spiral designs that can encompass the entire deer. These antlers sometimes hold a sun disc or other sun-related image. Other artwork from the same period further emphasizes the connection between the reindeer and the sun, which is a very common association in Siberian shamanism. Tattoos on buried warriors contain deer, featuring antlers embellished with small birds' heads. This reindeer-sun-bird imagery perhaps symbolizes the shaman's spiritual transformation from the earth to the sky: the passage from earthly life to heavenly life. As these deer images also appear in warrior tattoos, it is possible that reindeer were believed to offer protection from dangerous forces. Another theory is that the deer spirit served as a guide to assist the warrior soul to heaven.

=== Other animals ===
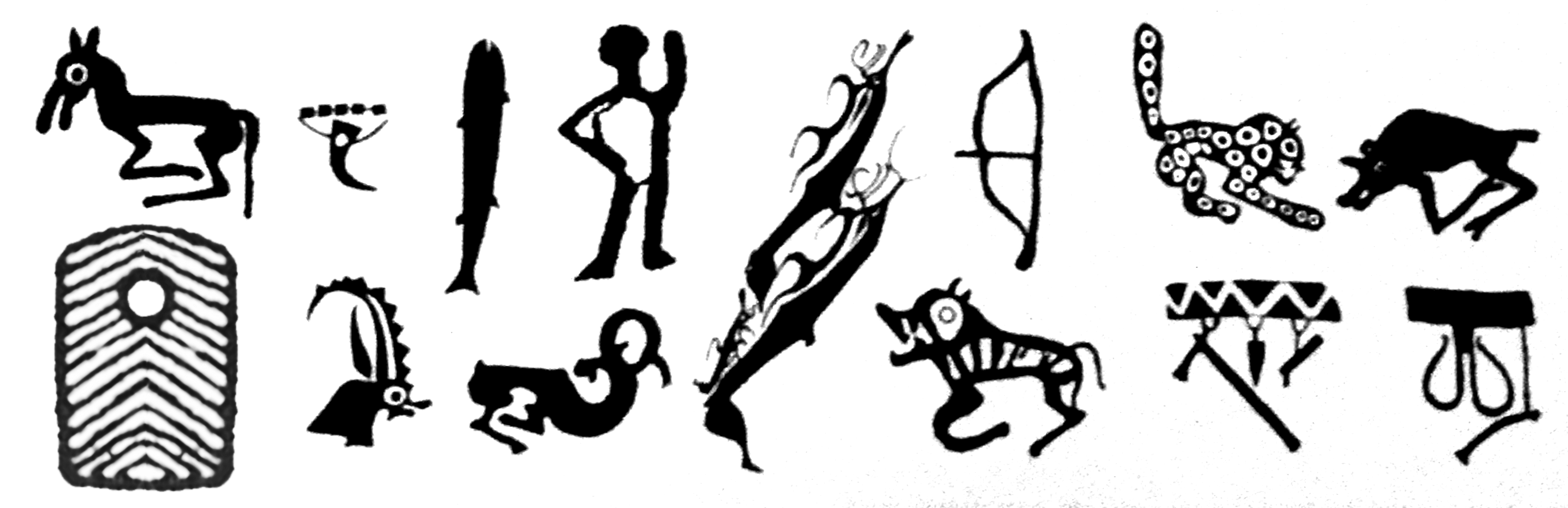
Some of the pictures on Deer stones, including a variety of animals and tools or weapons.

Particularly in the Sayan-Altai stones, a multitude of other animals are present in deer stone imagery. One can see depictions of tigers, pigs, cows, horse-like creatures, frogs and birds. Unlike the reindeer, however, these animals are depicted in a more natural style. This lack of ornate detailing indicates the lack of supernatural importance of such animals, taking an obvious backseat against the reindeer. The animals are often paired off with one another in confrontation, e.g. a tiger confronting a horse in a much more earthly activity.

=== Patterns ===
Chevron patterns crop up occasionally, usually in the upper regions of the stone. These patterns can be likened to military shields, suggesting the stones' connection to armed conflict. It has also been suggested that chevron patterns could be a shamanic emblem representing the skeleton.

=== Human faces ===
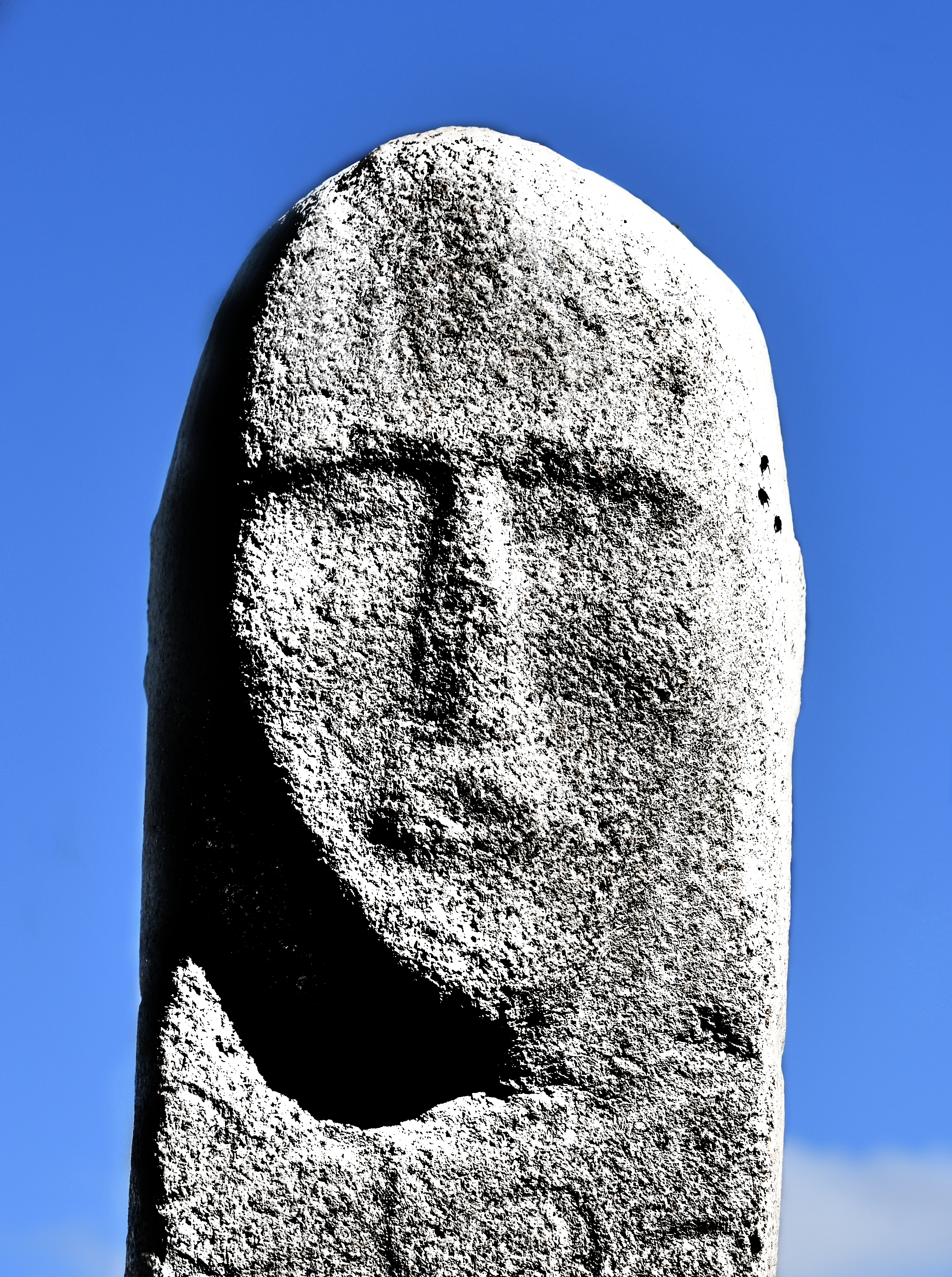
Anthropomorphic deer stone with realistic human face. Uushigiin Övör site, Deer Stone 14, near Mörön, northern Mongolia.

The top of the stones is generally rounded or flat, but often sculpted at an angle so that the higher side faces the east. Human faces are a much rarer occurrence and are usually carved into the top of the stone, also facing east. The face is sometimes only depicted symbolically, with a few regular slash marks (//, ///). The neck is generally adorned by a necklace, in the form of strings of beads, and large circular earrings are often depicted on the sides, an apparent Late Bronze Age fashion. These faces seem to be carved with an open mouth, as though singing. This also suggests a religious/shamanistic connection of the deer stone, as vocal expression is a common and important theme in shamanism.

Such depictions suggest burials around central figures, characteristic of rather organized and stratified pastoralist societies. Horse were buried together, as well as horse bits. The powerful nomadic leaders, leading large-scale organized nomadic groups, may have affected the late Shang and early Zhou dynasties of China to the south, and may have some connection with the infamous Xianyun of Chinese history.

Human faces on deer stones sometimes appear as belonging to a Europoid type, with long faces, long noses and deeply carved close-set eyes. Some figures appear hooded in Early Nomadic or Scytho-Siberian style.

=== Weapons and tools ===
The leaders depicted in these deer Stones (dated to 1400-700 BCE) were equipped with weapons and instruments of war, such as swords, daggers, knives, shafted axes, quivers, fire starters, or curved rein holders for their chariots. Weapons and tools can be seen throughout all the stones, though weapons make a stronger appearance in the Sayan-Altai stones. Bows and daggers appear frequently, as well as typical Bronze-Age implements, such as fire-starters or chariot rein holders. The appearance of these tools helps date the stones to the Bronze Age.

Deer stones weapons are generally derived from those of the contemporary Karasuk culture to the northwest, a well-known center for ancient metallurgy with influences as far as Shang dynasty China.

Weapons on Deer stones (Type I and Types II&III)

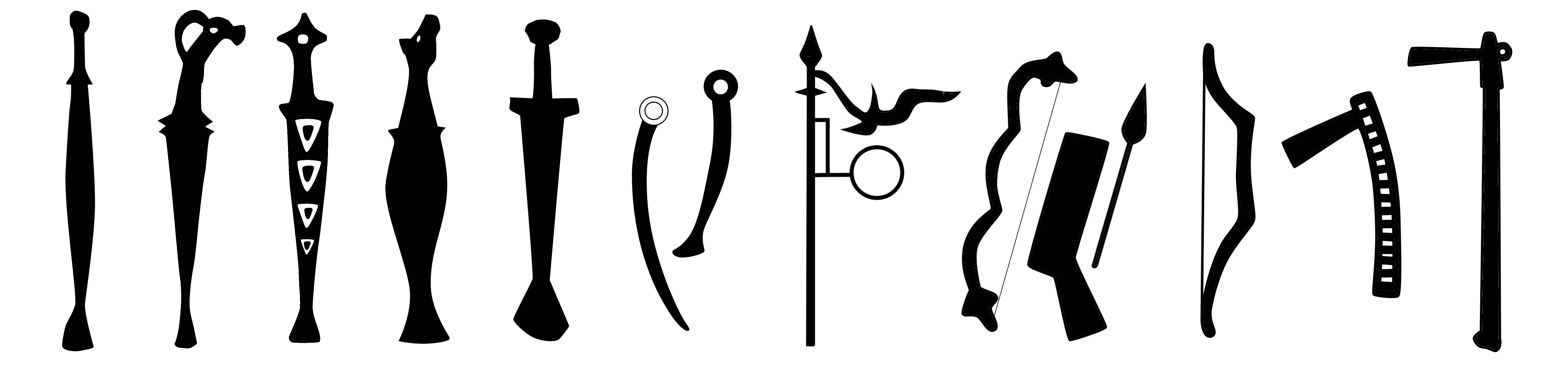
Depictions of weapons on Deer stones (Type I): long sword with scabbard, dagger with horned animal head and scabbard, sword with openwork scabbard, dagger with animal head and scabbard, dagger with pommel, knife with ring, knife with ring and sheath, lance with pennon, bows and quiver, hatchet, long-shaft socketed axe.

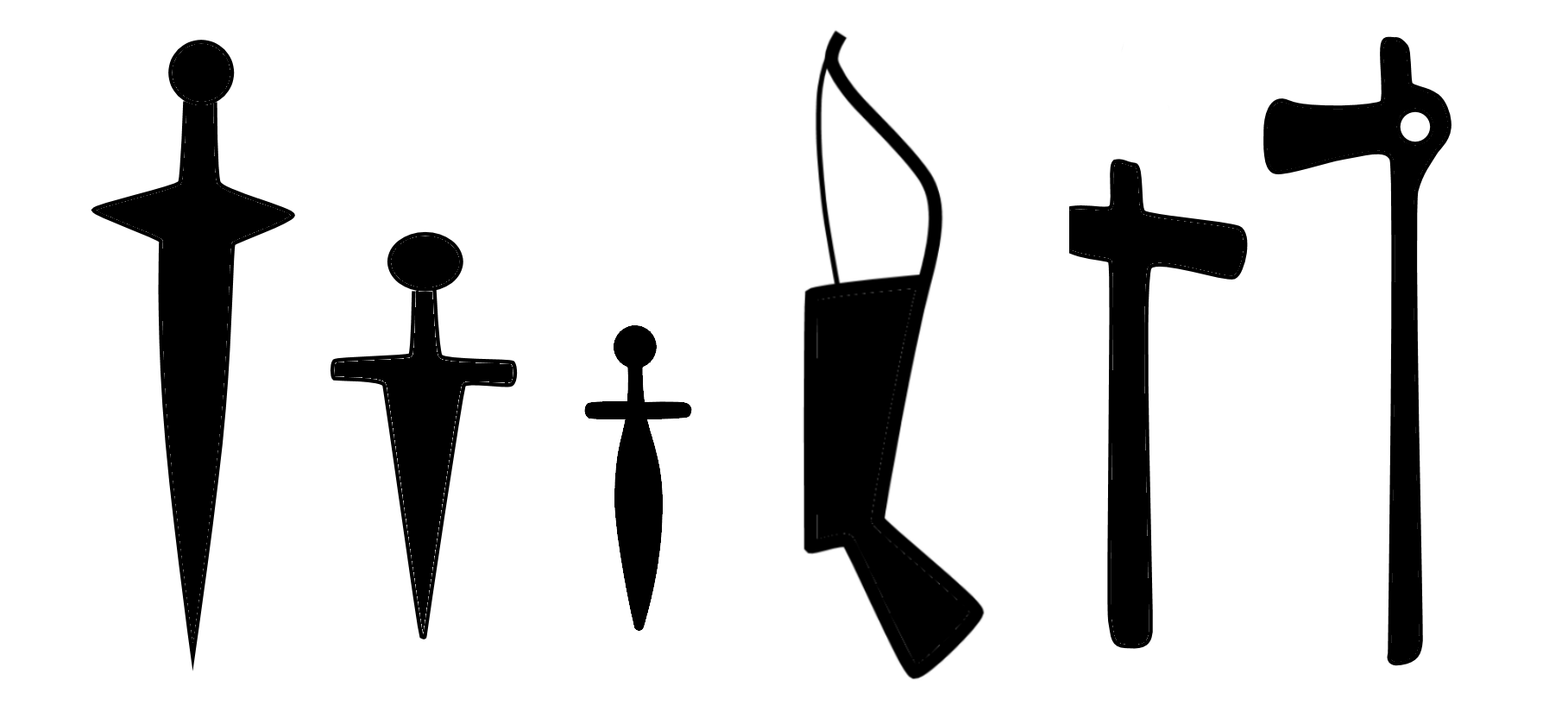
Depictions of weapons on Deer stones (Types II and III): double-bladed straight swords and daggers with round pommels, recurve bow, long-shaft axes.

=== Horses and chariots ===
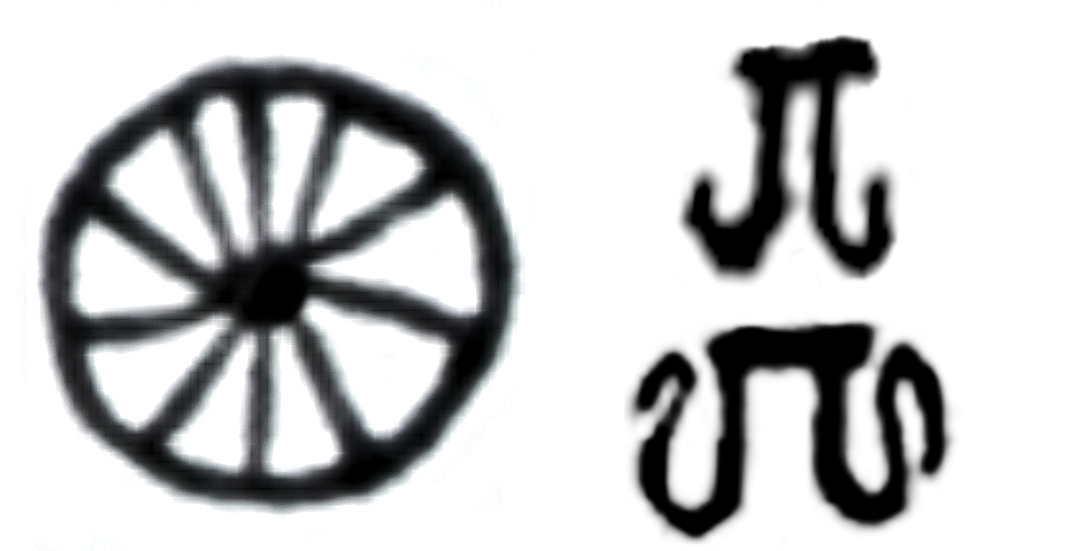
Wheels and rein hooks in deer stones petroglyphs.

The earliest domesticated horses in Mongolia belong to the people of the Deer Stone culture.

Although horses seem to have been central to the lifestyle of the deer stone builders, it is unclear if their horses were used for riding or for pulling carts. Actually, among all of the pictures available from the deer Stones, none represent a rider on a horse. So far, the first evidence of horse riding in eastern Eurasia dates to the early 1st millennium BCE in the Altai Mountains, and uncontrovertible evidence in the form of horse saddles dates to 400 BCE only, from the Saka sites of the Pazyryk culture. On the contrary, images of horse chariots appear on some of the deer Stone monuments from central Mongolia, including a two-horse and a four-horse vehicle.

Various tools typical of chariot riding also appear in the drawing of the deer stones, such as rein holders. Rein holders were designed to hold the reins in place to free the rider's hands, and were probably hung to the rider's waist. They worked as rein hooks, attached at the belt, for "hands free" horse control while using weapons.

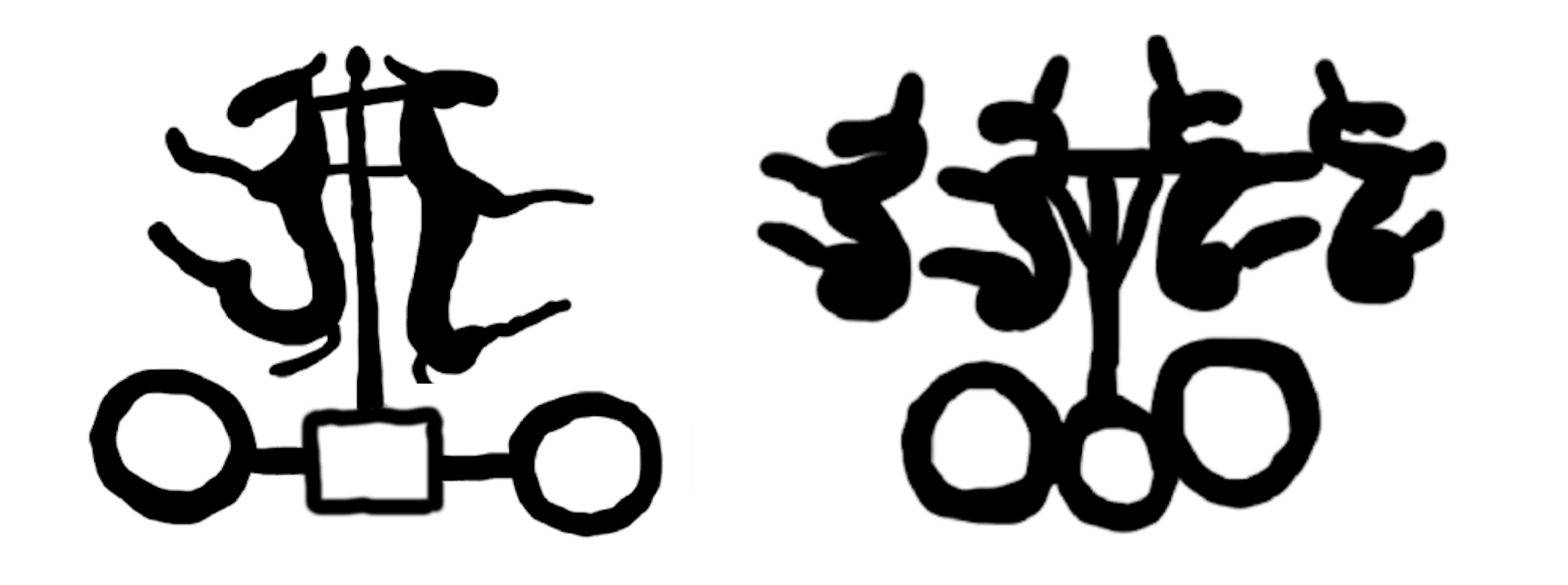
Chariot images on Mongolian Deer Stone monuments, including a two-horse vehicle (Darvi soum, Khovd aimag), and a four-horse vehicle (Zuunkhangai soum, Uvs aimag).

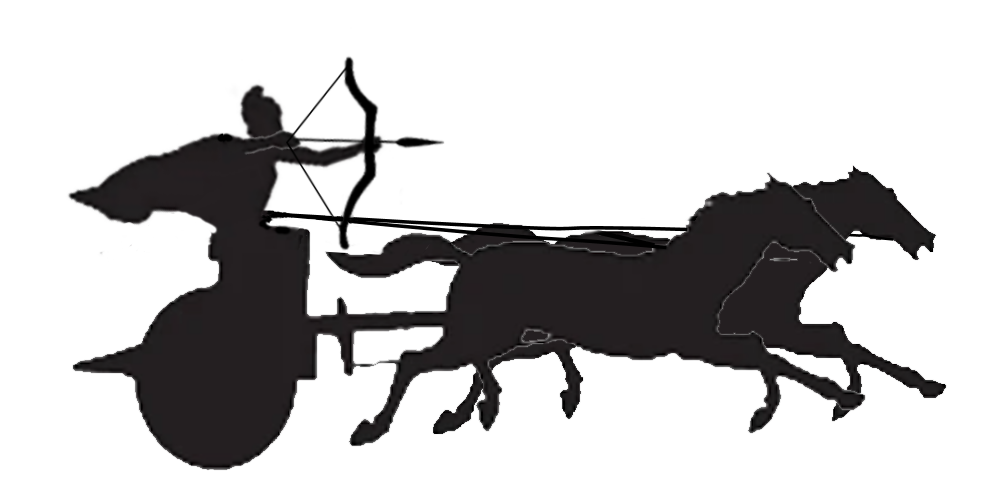
Hypothetical reconstruction of an early Eastern Eurasian chariot, of a type known since the Andronovo culture in Southern Siberia and Mongolia, c. 1800-1200 BCE.

== Origin and purpose ==
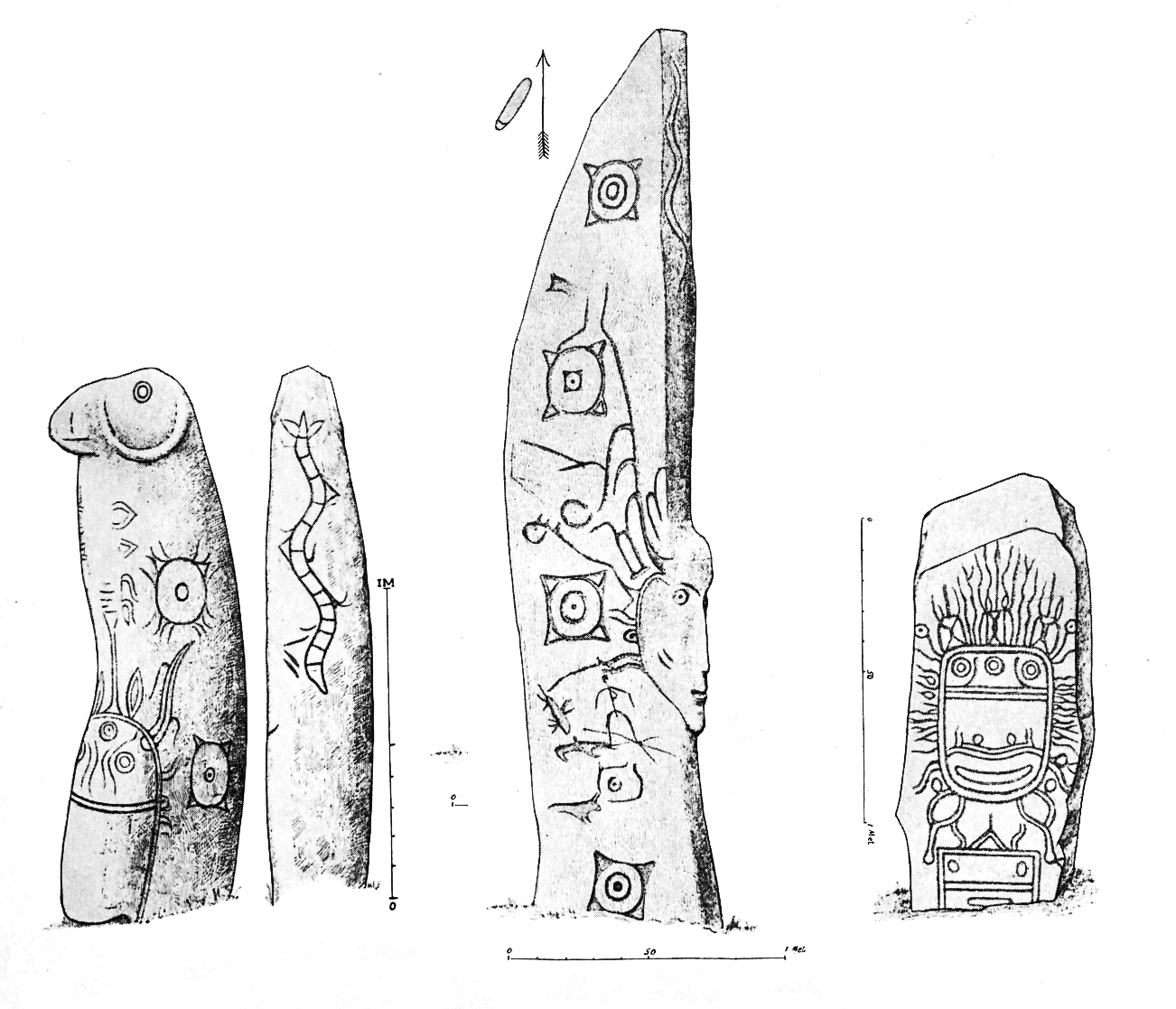
Steles of the Siberian Okunev culture (c.2700-1800 BCE), about one thousand years before the Deer stones culture.

The origins of the art of the deer stones remain uncertain. According to current data, the art of the deer stones could be indirectly derived from an un-preserved tradition of Karasuk-related cultures, with possible antecedents in the depiction of human figures in the Yamnaya culture of the Western Steppes in the 2nd-1st millennium BCE, such as the Kernosivsky idol. Cimmerian stone stelae-Kurgan stelae may be part of the answer. The Siberian Okunev culture (2700-1800 BCE) also has a long tradition of totemic standing stones from the 3rd millennium BCE.

The original artistic impulse for the classical deer stones may have to be found in the animals of the northern Siberian ecosystem and their representations in petroglyphic art, as far as the Neolithic. As explained by Jacobson:

The general reasoning . . . is straightforward: the animals which dominate the archaic Scytho-Siberia style are all animals of the northern forest or forest-steppe. Furthermore . . . the archaic nature of the early nomadic styles and images indicates not only a tradition of bone and wood carving but also a tradition of zoomorphic representation that goes back as far as the Siberian Neolithic. The particular combination of cervids (deer, elk, reindeer), felines (panthers and tigers), caprids . . . and birds-of-prey, evident in the early art of the Early Nomads and that of their immediate predecessors, depends upon the emergence of an artistic tradition among the hunting-dependent Bronze Age cultures of South Siberia and Mongolia.

— Jacobson 1993, quoted in Fitzhugh 2009.

Globally, the Classical Mongolian type does appear to have been the first generation of deer stones, suggesting a pre-deer stone tradition before 1500 BCE, originating in the Siberian northern taiga forest. Deer stones culture then may have spread westward under the pressure of the Slab-grave culture, to meet with an early Scythian Altai tradition, where the Sayan-Altai style of deer stones then developed.

=== Genetic profile ===
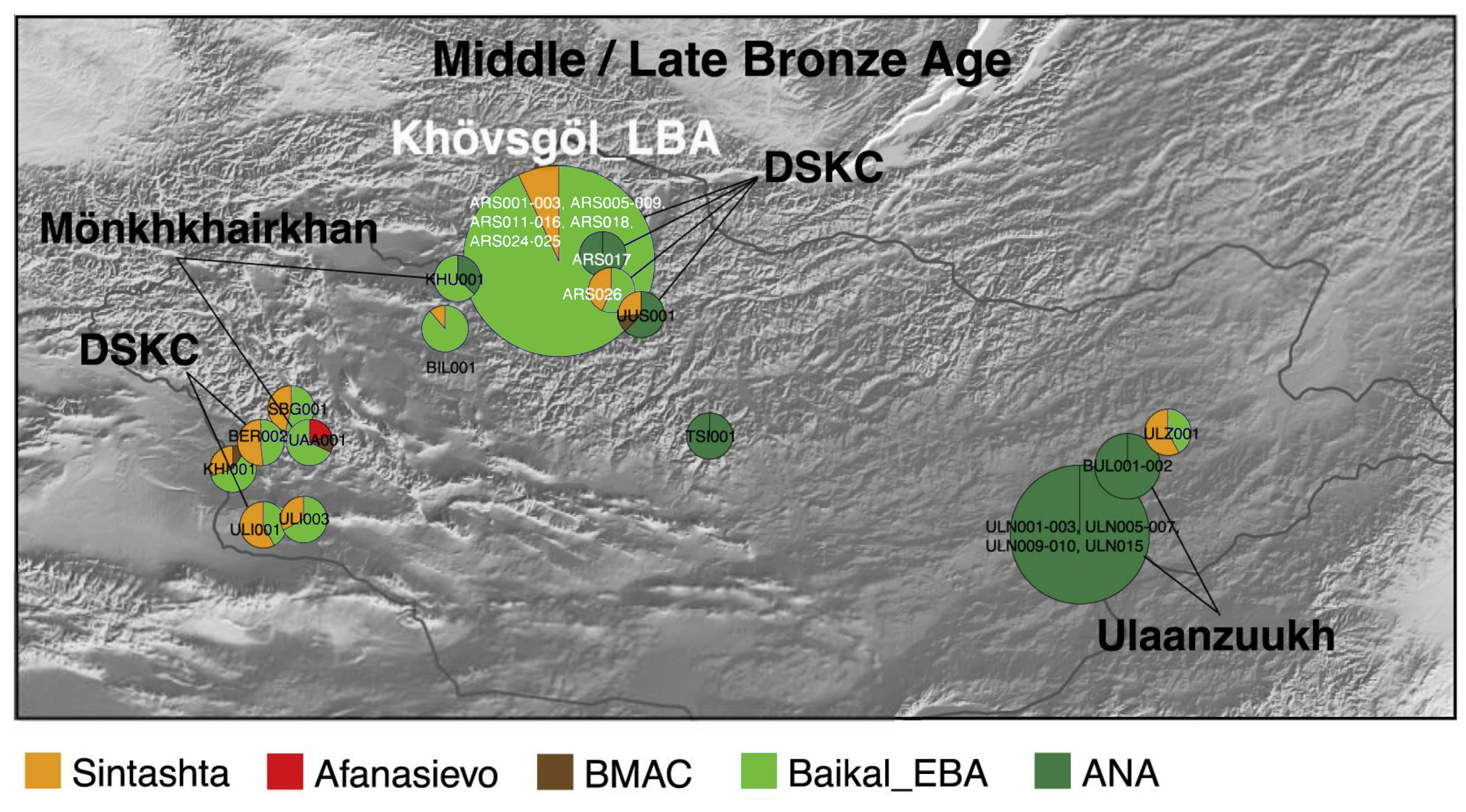
Genetic profile of DSKC burials in western and northern Mongolia.

Genetic analyses of individuals buried in Late Bronze Age (LBA) burial mounds associated with the Deer Stone-Khirigsuur Complex (DSKC) in northern Mongolia, found that these individuals primarily derived from Khövsgöl LBA source (about 4-7% Sintashta and 93-96% Baikal EBA). The individuals were close to contemporary Neolithic and Bronze Age Baikal populations, and clustered "on top of modern Tuvinians or Altaians".

The analysed individuals also included some outliers, with remains in westernmost Mongolia (also named Altai_MLBA) displaying a balanced West-East Eurasian ancestry, with about 45% Sintashta and 55% Baikal EBA, being virtually identical with that of the later Eastern Sakas, particularly from the Chandman culture (Chandman_IA), and remains with an increased Neolithic Amur genetic profile, displaying similarities with the Ulaanzuukh and Slab-grave culture to their East.

The Ulaanzuukh culture, distinct from the "Deer stone culture", and corresponding to burials in Southeastern Mongolia, had a purely Northeast Asian profile (nearly 100% ANA), with one outlier having a western Altai_MLBA profile.

Later cultures are known to have often reused the stones in their own burial mounds (known as kheregsüürs) and for other purposes.

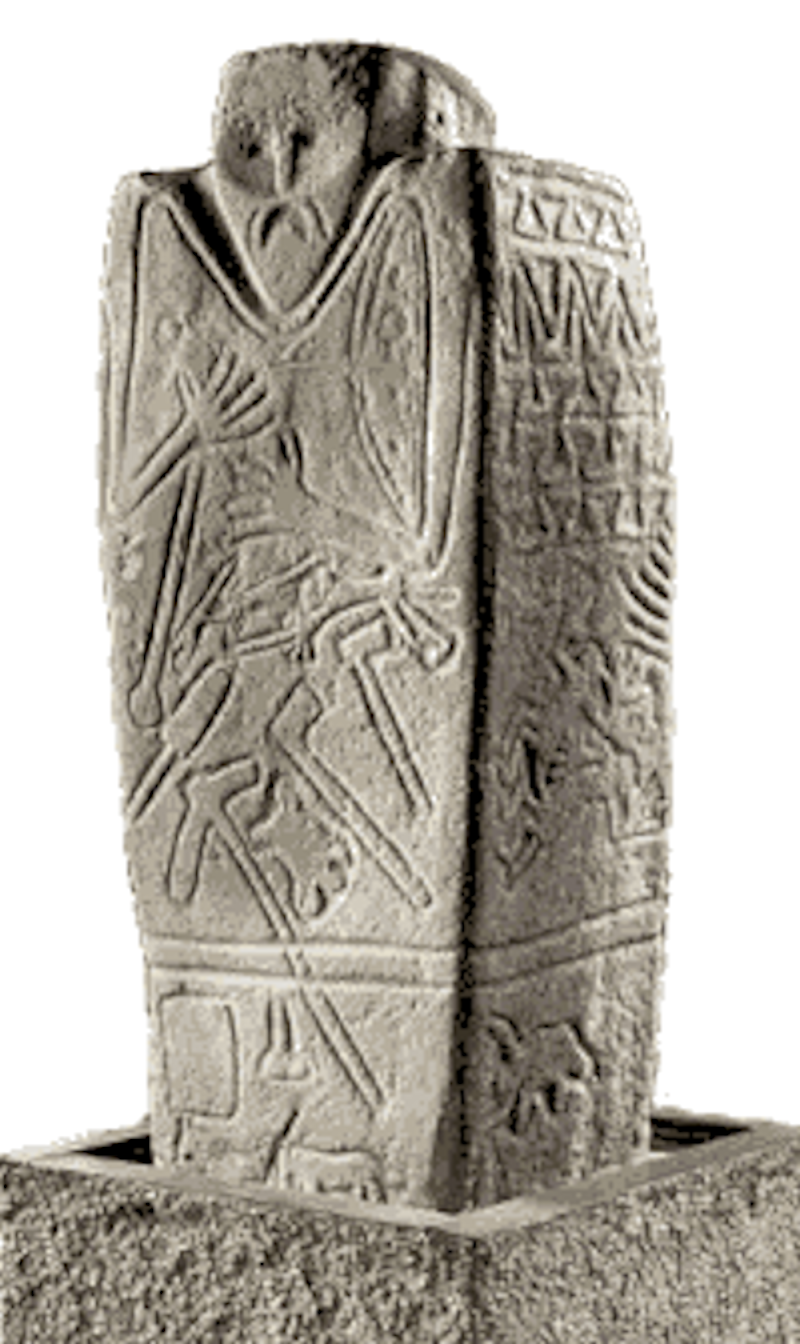
The Kernosivsky idol of the Yamnaya culture, circa 2000 BCE.

=== Historiography ===
In 1892, V.V. Radlov published a collection of drawings of deer stones in Mongolia. Radlov's drawings showed the highly stylized images of deer on the stones, as well as the settings in which they were placed. Radlov showed that in some instances the stones were set in patterns suggesting the walls of a grave, and in other instances, the deer stones were set in elaborate circular patterns, suggesting use in rituals of unknown significance.

In 1954 A.P. Okladnikov published a study of a deer stone found in 1856 by D.P. Davydov near modern Ulan-Ude now known as the Ivolga stone, displayed in the Irkutsk State Historical Museum. Okladinkov identified the deer images as reindeer, dated the stone's carving to the 6th-7th centuries BC, and concluded from its placement and other images that it was associated with funerary rituals, and was a monument to a warrior leader of high social prominence.

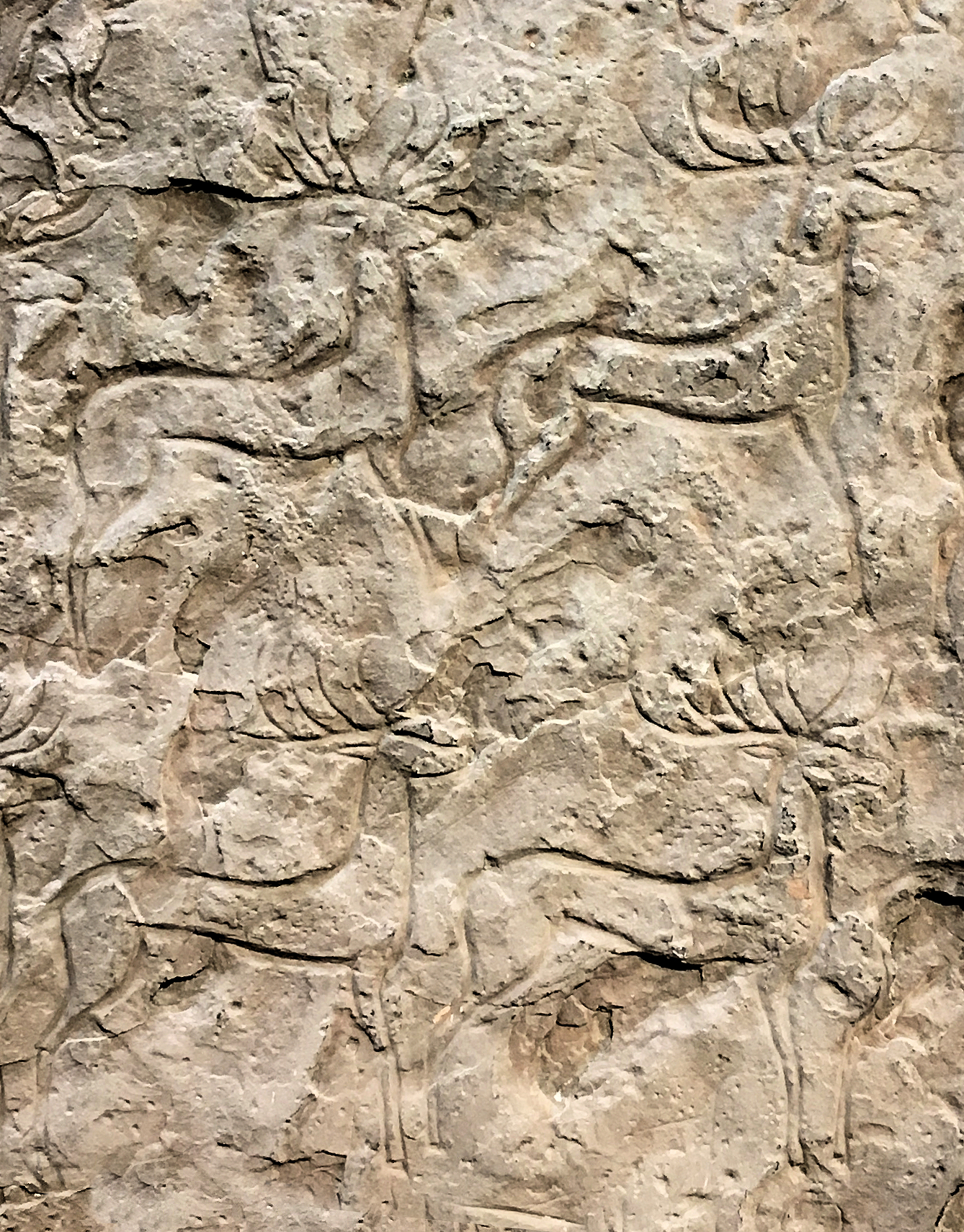
The Petroglyphic art of Siberia may be at the origin of the art of the Deer stones. Okunev culture, Siberia, circa 2000 BCE.

An extensive 1981 study by V.V. Volkov identified two cultural conditions behind the deer stones. The eastern deer stones appear to be associated with cemeteries of the Slab Grave culture. The other cultural tradition is associated with the circular structures suggesting use as the center of rituals.

There are several proposed theories for the purpose of the deer stones. There are different viewpoints about the origins of deer stone art. According to H.L. Chlyenova, the artistic deer image originated from the Saka tribe and its branches (Chlyenova 1962). Volkov believes that some of the methods of crafting deer stone art are closely related to Scythians (Volkov 1967).

Mongolian archaeologist D. Tseveendorj regards deer stone art as having originated in Mongolia during the Bronze Age and spread thereafter to Tuva and the Baikal area (Tseveendorj 1979).

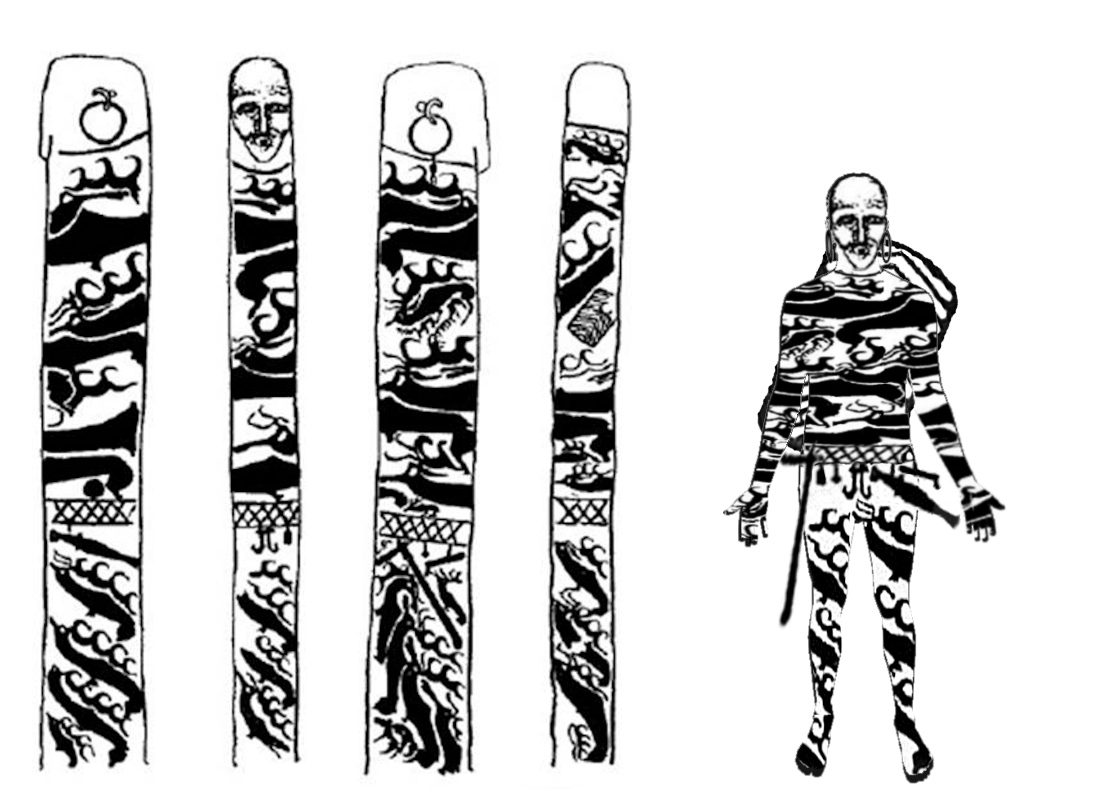
Body tattoos hypotheses, after the Classic Uushigiin Övör Deer Stone No.14. Similar tattoos have been found at Pazyryk.

D. G. Savinov (1994) and M. H. Mannai-Ool (1970) have also studied deer stone art and have reached other conclusions. The stones do not occur alone, usually with several other stone monuments, sometimes carved, sometimes not. The soil around these gatherings often contains traces of animal remains, for example, horses. Such remains were placed underneath these auxiliary stones. Human remains, on the other hand, were not found at any of the sites, which discredits the theory that the stones could function as gravestones. The markings on the stones and the presence of sacrificial remains could suggest a religious purpose, perhaps a prime location for the occurrence of shamanistic rituals.

Some stones include a circle at the top and stylised dagger and belt at the bottom, which has led some scholars, such as William Fitzhugh, to propose that the stones could represent a spiritualized human body, particularly that of a prominent figure such as a warrior or leader. The decorative flying deer would actually be the tattoos on the body of the deceased, as seen with the tattoos of an ice mummy from Pazyryk. This theory is reinforced by the fact that the stones are all very different in construction and imagery, which could be because each stone tells a unique story for the individual it represents.

In 2006, the Deer Stone Project of the Smithsonian Institution and Mongolian Academy of Sciences began to record the stones digitally with 3-D laser scanning.

== Legacy ==
=== Animal style ===
The artistic depictions of animals on deer Stones are the earliest recognized type of Animal style. This style would then spread across Central Asia during the 1st millennium BCE and become a characteristic feature of Scytho-Siberian art. The spread of animal style and Sayan-Altai deer stones was supported by the westward migration of Scythian groups, which came to be known as Saka or Sarmatians in Greek records.

To the southeast, the Upper Xiajiadian culture is considered as the earliest "Scythian" (Saka) culture in North China, starting the 9th century BCE. The development of animal styles there may have been the result of contacts with the nomads of Mongolia in the 9th — 8th centuries BCE.

=== Contemporary artifacts in western Mongolia ===
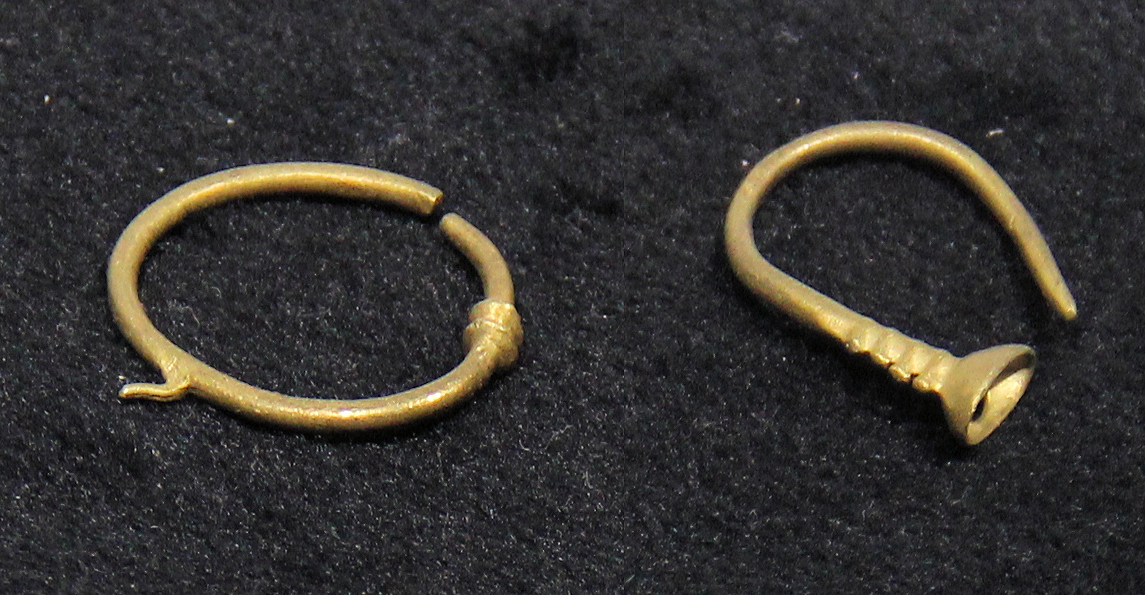
Bronze Age gold earrings, Burgastain gol, Uvs Province, Mongolia. National Museum of Mongolia

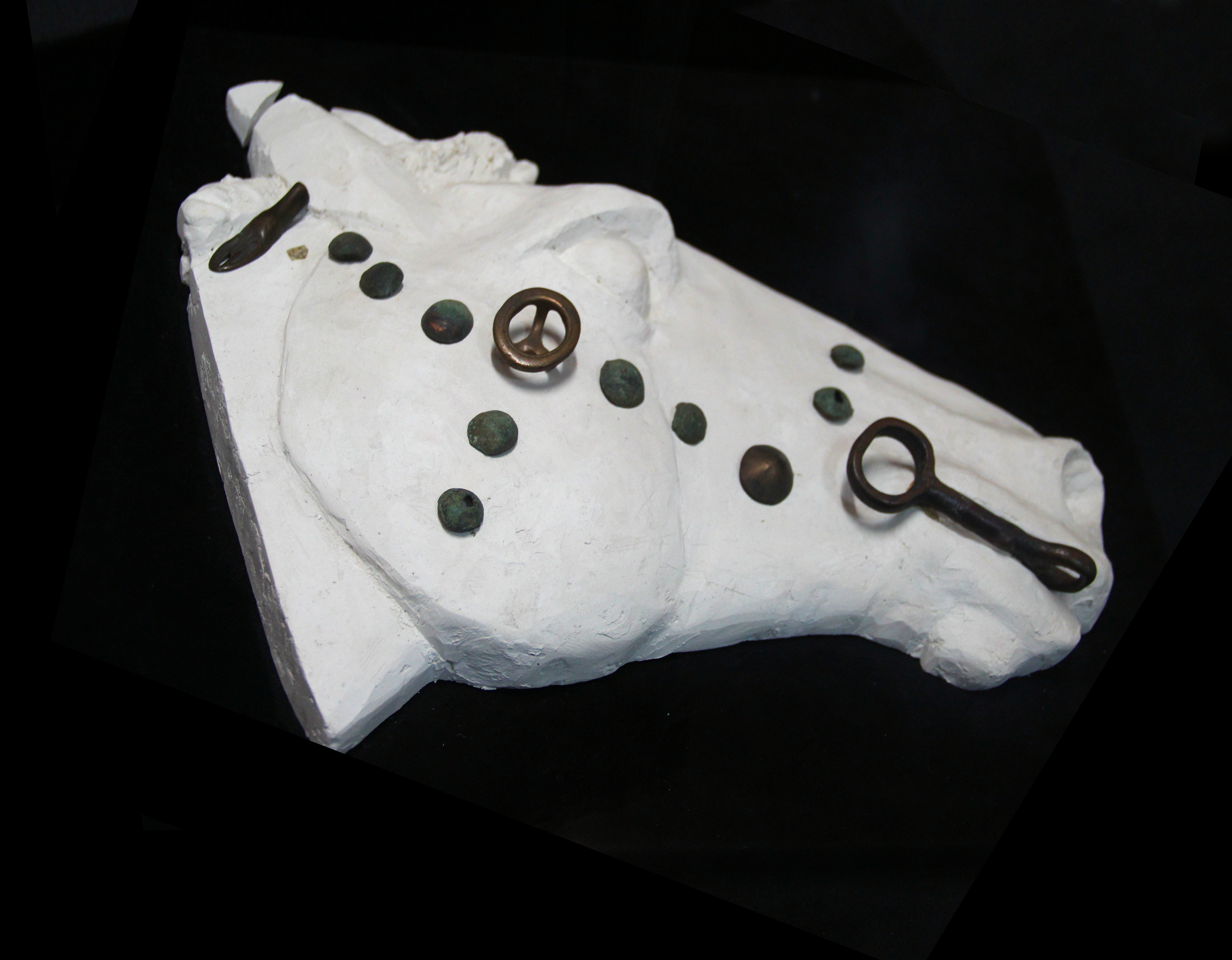
Bronze Age bronze bridle ornaments, 1200-800 BCE, National Museum of Mongolia

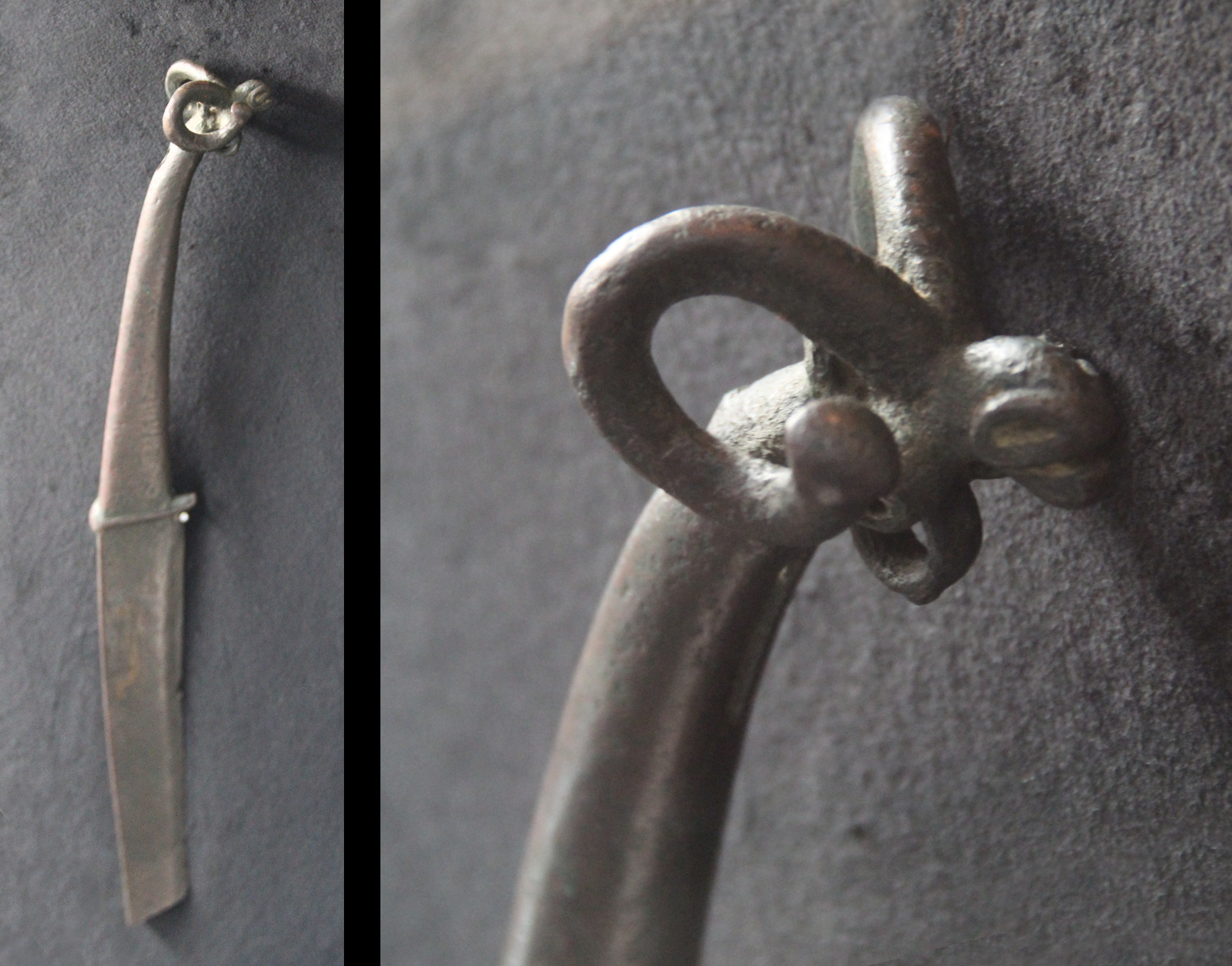
Bronze Age knife, 1200-800 BCE, Khovd aimag, Mongolia. National Museum of Mongolia.

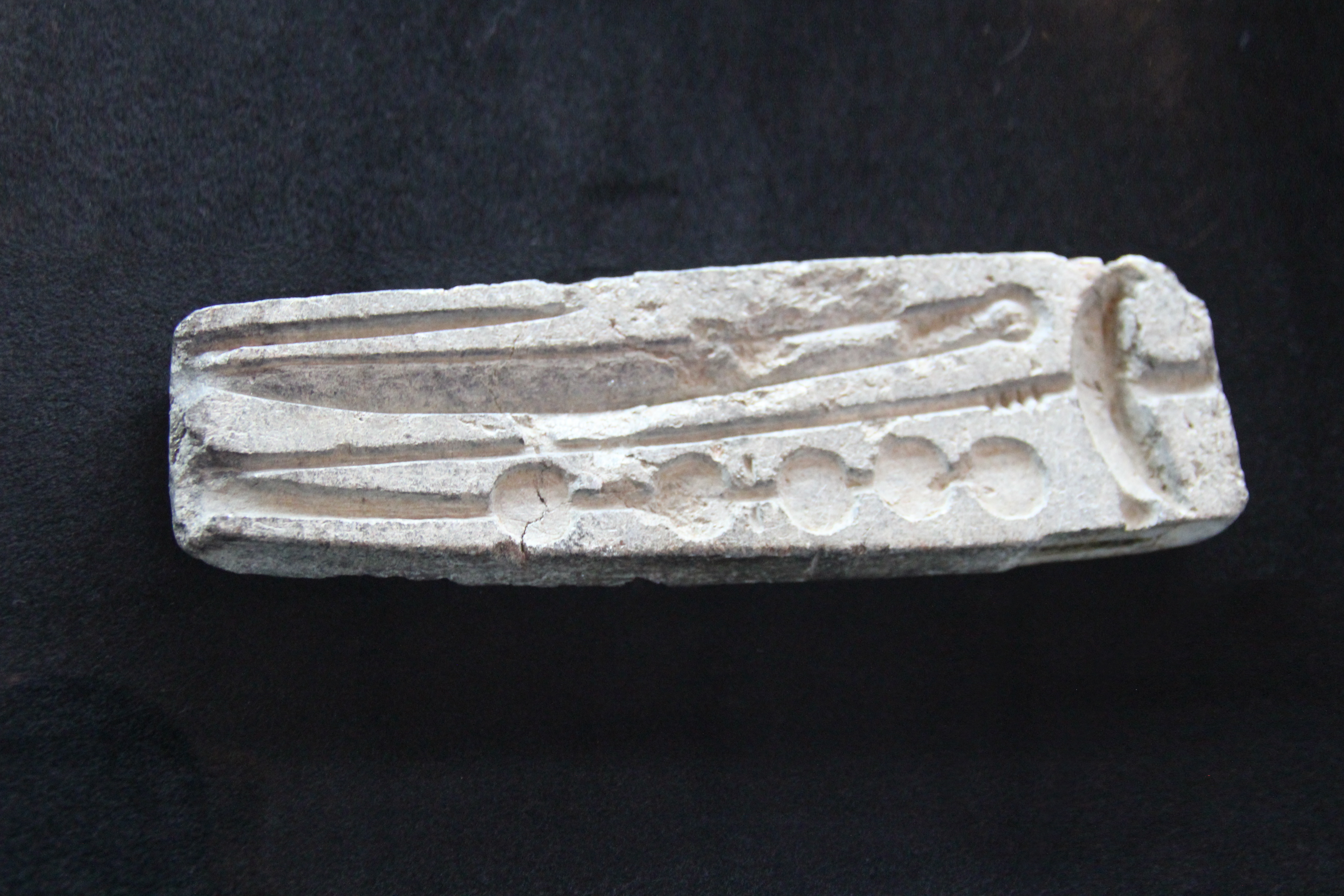
Stone mold for the casting of bronze objects, 1500-400 BCE, National Museum of Mongolia

=== Transmission of chariot warfare and weapon designs to China ===
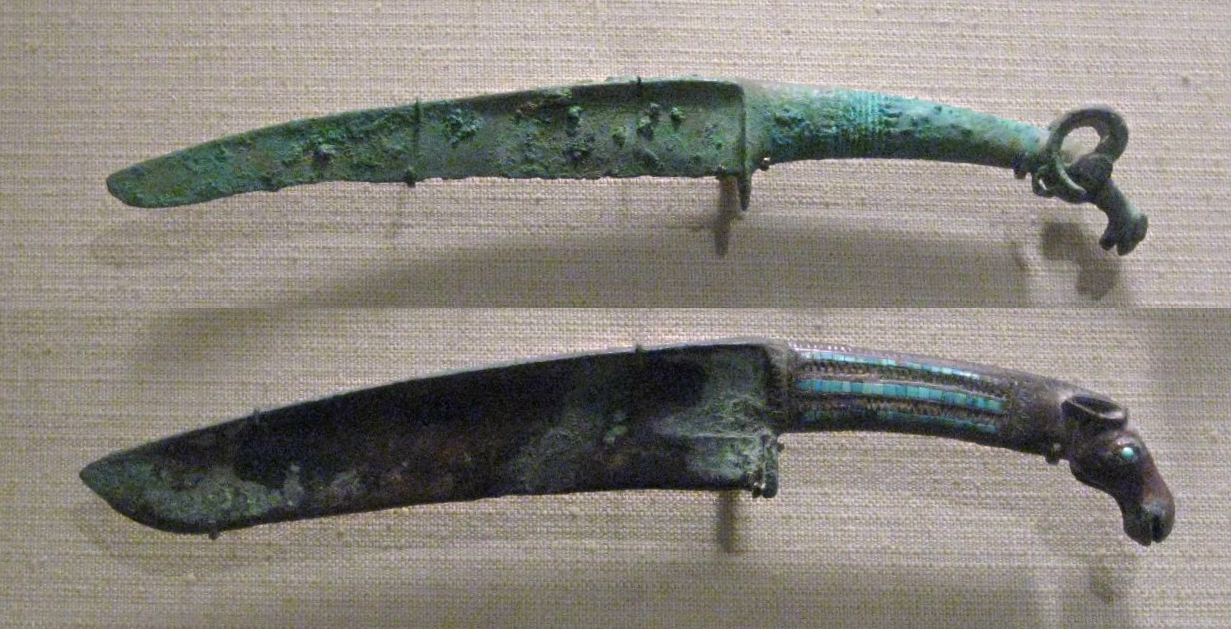
Shang dynasty curved bronze knives with animal pommel. 12th-11th century BCE. Such knives were the result of contacts with the northern people of the Mongolian steppe.

Chariots were used for a long time in Western Eurasia, and the development of the horse chariot in the deer Stone culture is an expansion of it, but it also probably impulsed the rise of the horse chariot in Shang dynasty China. The area of the Mongolian plateau corresponding to the Deerstone-Khirigsuurs culture has been identified as a "major region of origin for chariot and horse use in East Asia (and their associated weapons and tools), and also the likely source for the chariots and horses employed at Anyang" (the Chinese Shang capital), contributing weapon technology and designs, as well as the horse chariot itself. Rein holders first appear in China at Yinxu circa 1200 BCE, and were probably introduced in China from the Northern Zones.

The adoption of the chariot in China is dated to circa 1200 BCE, at the time of the Shang Emperor Wu Ding. Major conflicts with chariot-riding northern enemies, called Guifang ("Devil people") or Xianyun by the Chinese, are also reported around that time in Chinese inscriptions.

Various other people probably contributed to the transfer of these technologies from the Mongolian steppe to Shang dynasty China, such as the people of Tevsh-Ulaanzuukh culture of southern Mongolia, who also had hand weapons broadly similar to those of the Deer stones culture. Northern people were seemingly present in large number in the Chinese capital of Anyang, as suggested by the numerous burials in prone position together with charioting equipment. They were probably used by the Chinese for their specialist charioting skills and related warfare techniques. Numerous Chinese artifacts in Northern Steppes style have been identified.

The art of the deer stones may also have influenced Chinese art, particularly the sudden apparition of naturalism and animal themes during the Western Zhou (1045–771 BCE).

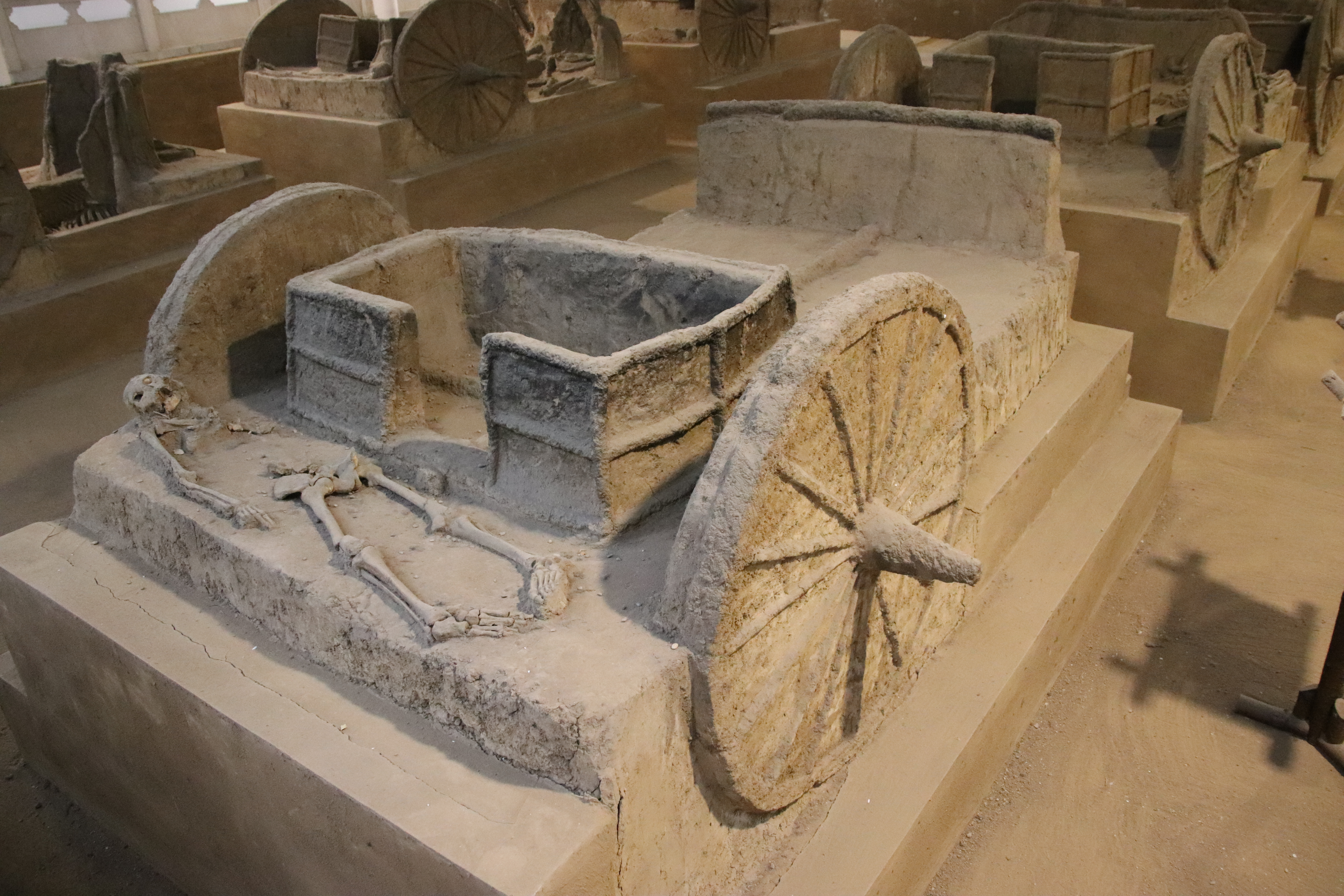
Shang war charriots at Yinxu. Their technology was introduced from the Deer stone culture.

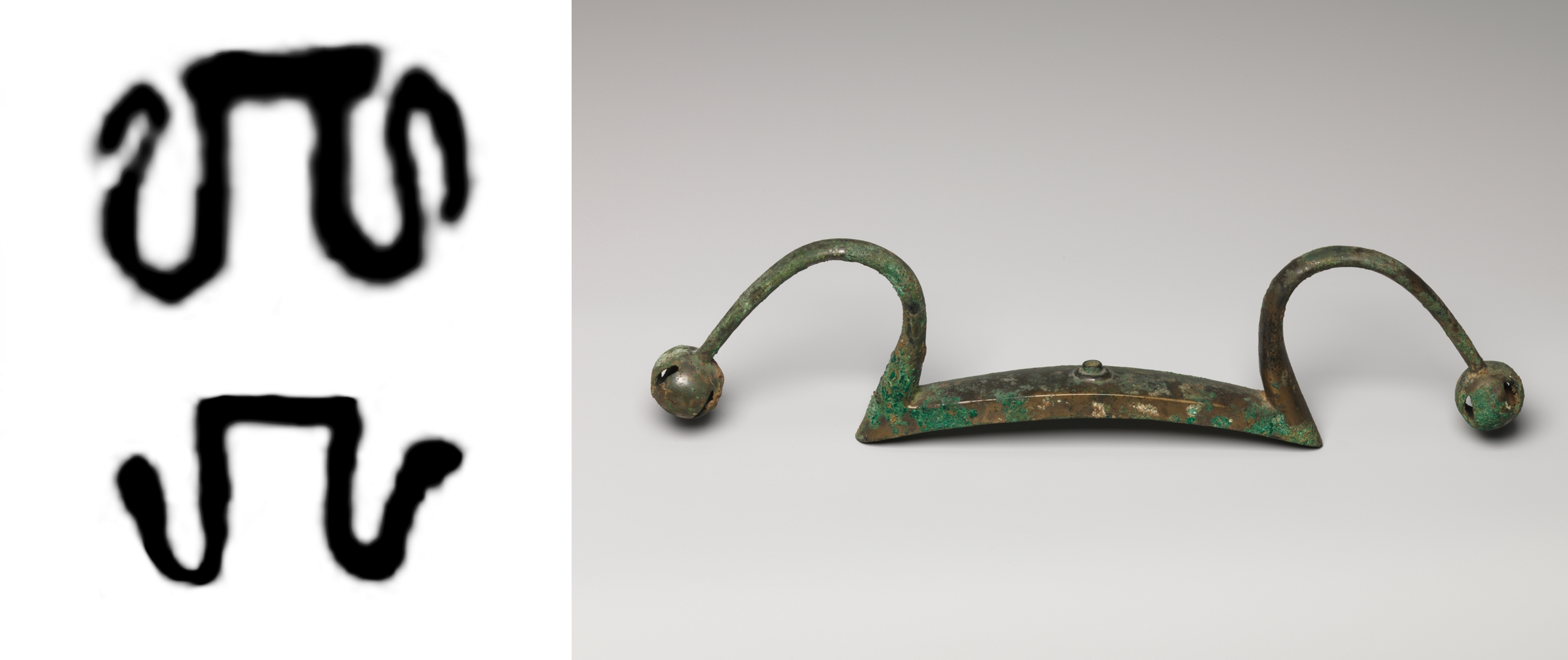
Deer stone drawings of rein holders (left), and Chinese Shang dynasty bronze rein holder, ca. 11th century BCE (right).

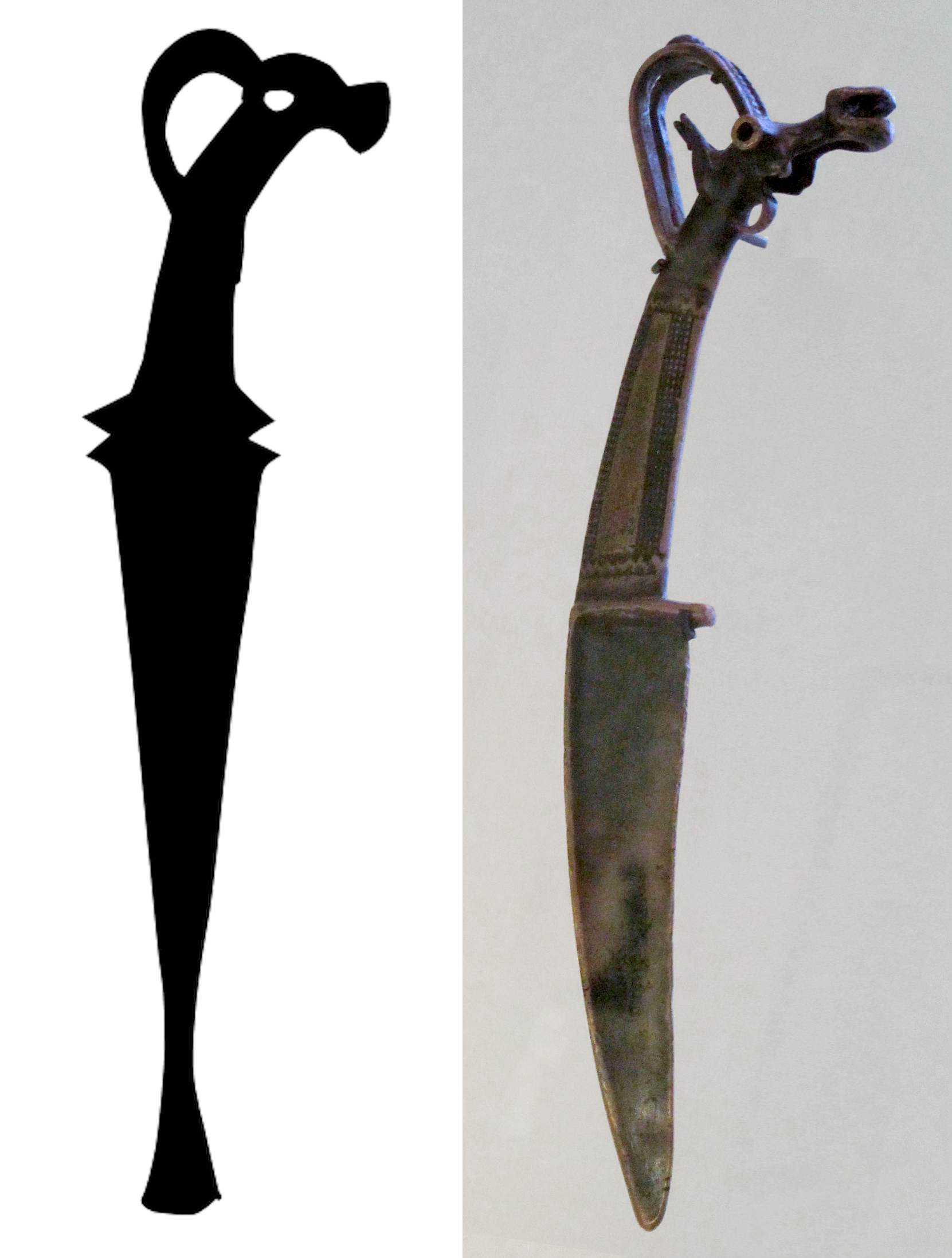
Deer stone drawing of a dagger and its scabbard (left), and Chinese Shang dynasty knife in Northern Steppe style (right).

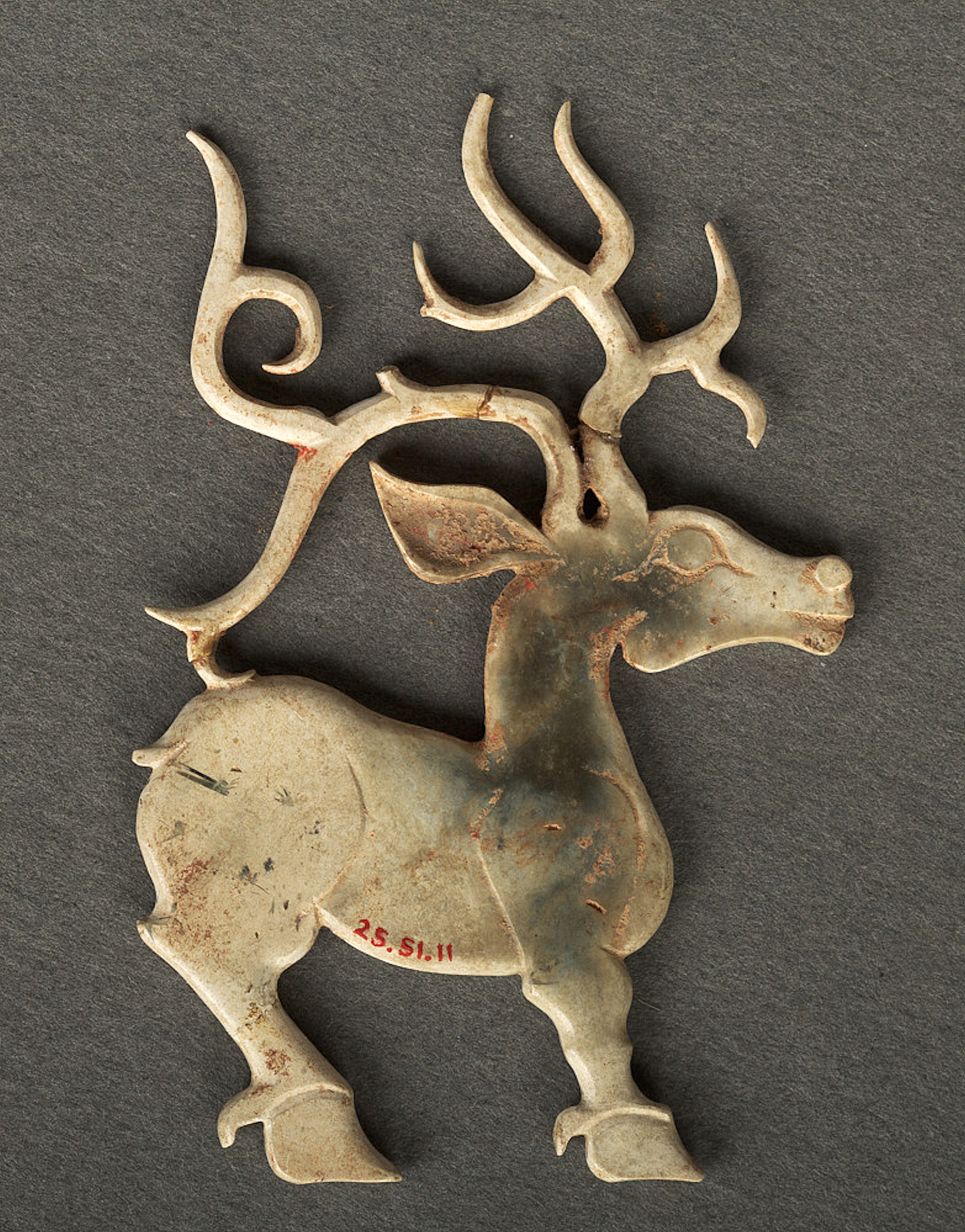
Jade standing deer (西周玉鹿), Western Zhou, 11-9th century BCE.

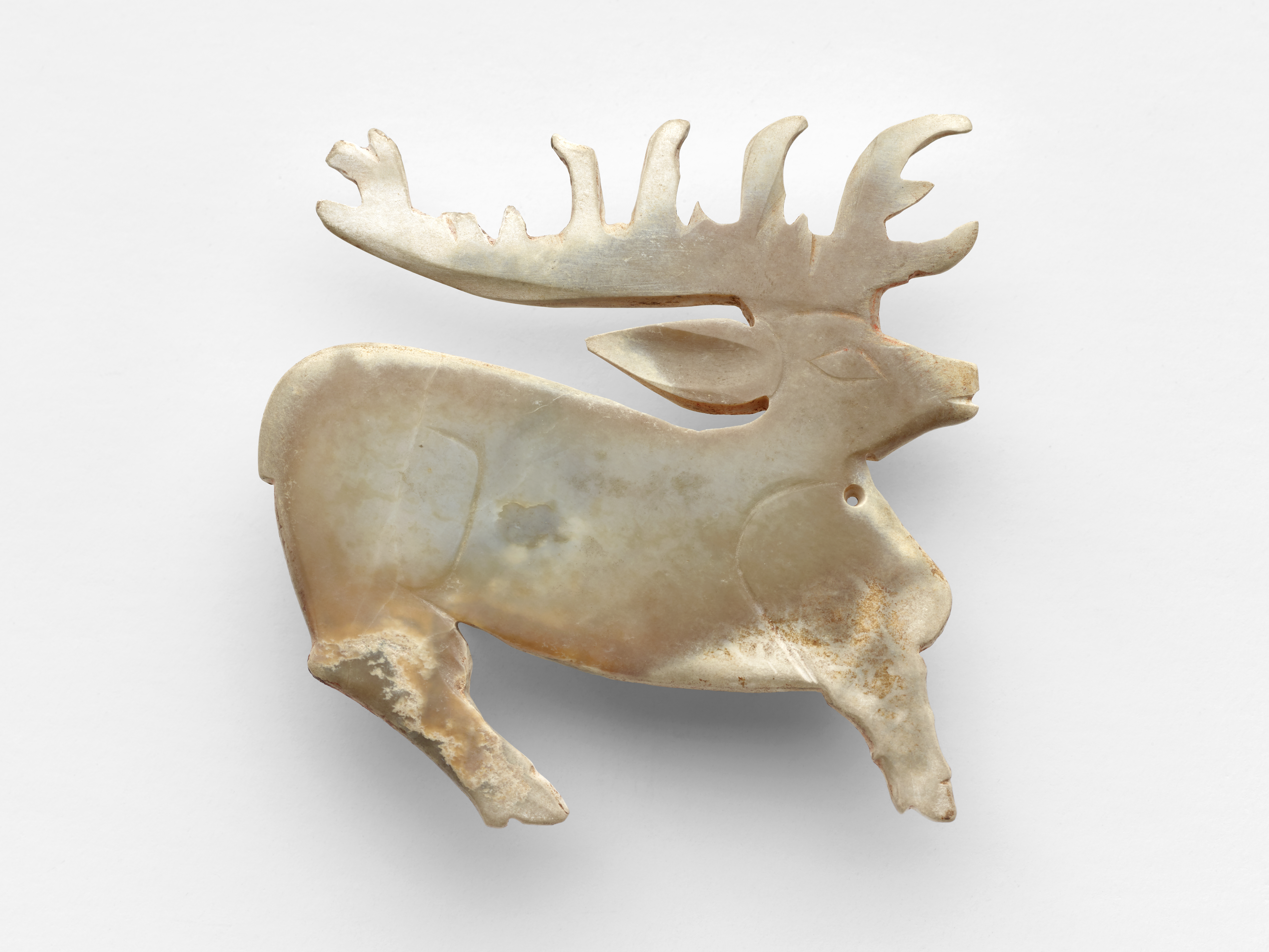
Pendant in the form of a stag. Western Zhou dynasty, ca. 1050-ca. 950 BCE.

== Demise and legacy ==
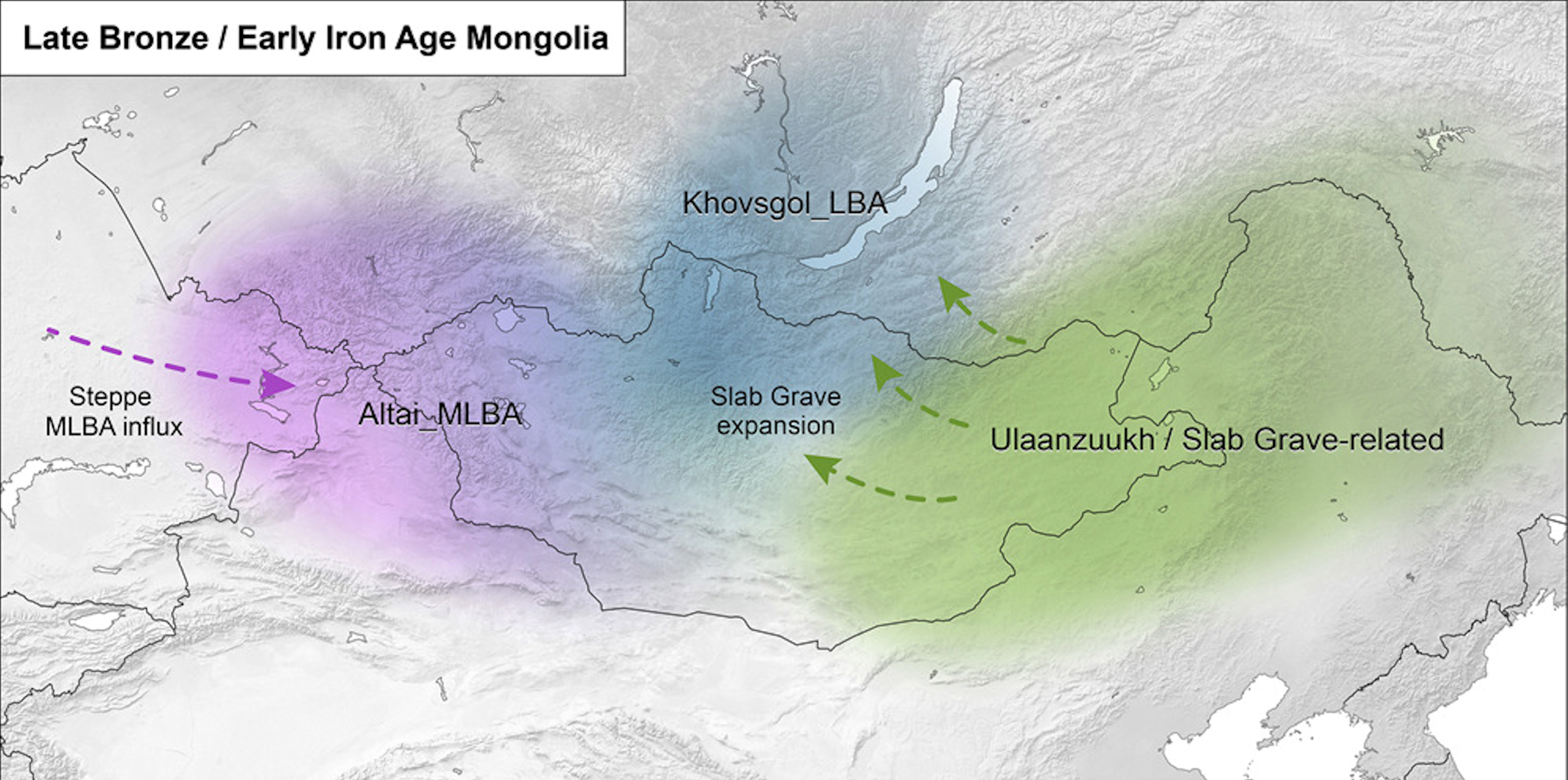
From around 700 BCE, in the Early Iron Age, the Slab-grave culture ( ) expanded into central Mongolia and took over Deer stones sites. In southern Siberia and western Mongolia, the Classical Saka culture ( ) started to flourish.

The "Deer stone culture" was replaced by the Slab-grave culture in central and eastern Mongolia around 700 BCE. To the west, the "Deer stone culture" was replaced by, or evolved into, the various Saka cultures, such as the Uyuk culture, the Chandman culture, and the Pazyryk culture.

While the majority of Slab Grave remains were of primarily Neolithic Amur ancestry, some Slab Grave remains displayed admixed ancestry between Neolithic Amur and pre-existing Khövsgöl/Baikal hunter-gatherers, consistent with the proposed expansion of Ulaanzuukh/Slab Grave ancestry north and westwards and archaeological evidence.

== See also ==
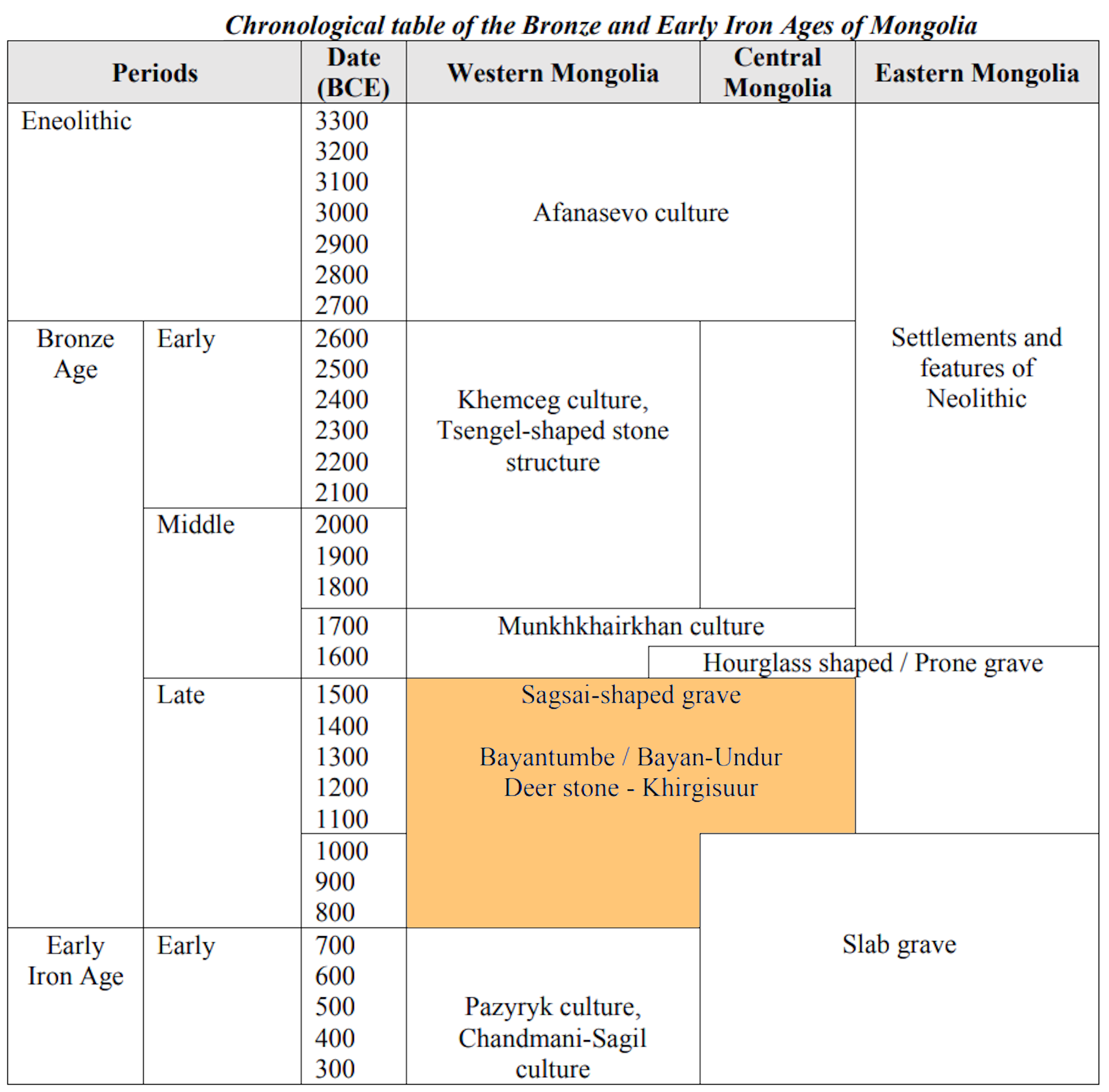
Chronological table of the Deer stones culture, with Bronze and Early Iron Ages of Mongolia.

- Carlin stone
- Dolmens
- Gowk Stone
- List of megalithic sites
- Megalith
- Menhir
- Obelisk
- Santa's reindeer
- Standing stone
- Statue menhir
