= Afanasievo culture =

Chalcolithic archaeological culture of Siberia

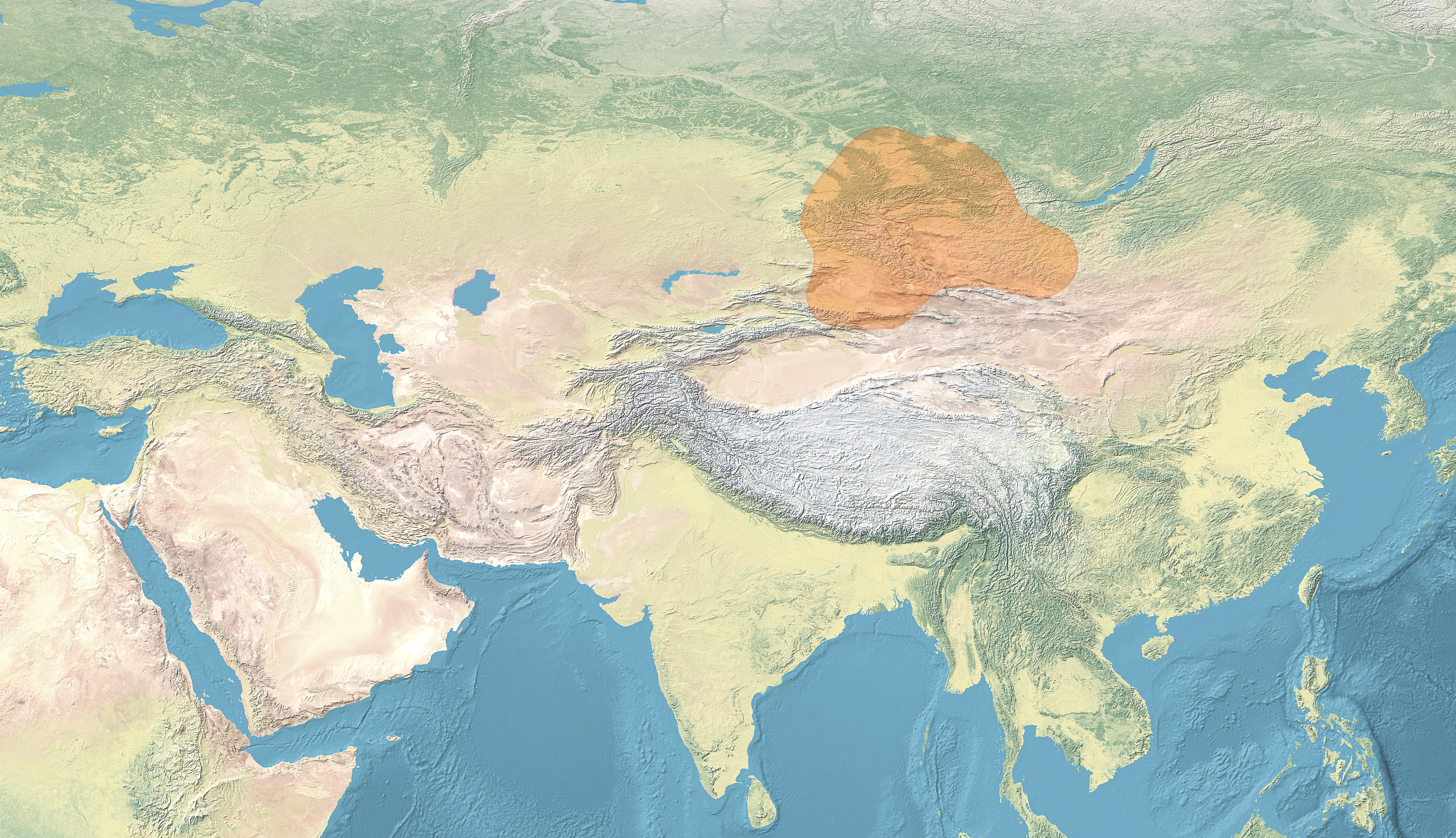
- Afanasievo culture and contemporary polities c. 3000 BCE. : Original site of Gora Afanasieva, Minusinsk Basin. : Ukok Plateau Afanasievo burials. : Ürümqi (Tuqiu) Afanasievo burials. The area of Dzungaria also had Afanasievo burials and close genetic connection. : Afanasievo burials at Altan Sandal and Shatar Chuluu in central Mongolia. See Afanasievo sites in Mongolia
- Alternative names: Afanasevo culture; Afanasevans
- Geographical range: South Siberia
- Period: Bronze Age
- Dates: 3300–2500 BCE
- Type site: Gora Afanasieva (Minusinsk Basin)
- Followed by: Chemurchek culture, Okunev culture, Karakol culture, Andronovo culture, Deer stones culture

The Afanasievo culture, or Afanasevo culture (Afanasevan culture) (Russian: Афанасьевская культура Afanas'yevskaya kul'tura), is an early archaeological culture of south Siberia, occupying the Minusinsk Basin and the Altai Mountains during the eneolithic era, c. 3300 to 2500 BCE. It is named after a nearby mountain, Gora Afanasieva (Russian: Гора Афанасьева, lit. 'Afanasiev's mountain') in what is now Bogradsky District, Khakassia, Russia, first excavated by archaeologist Sergei Teploukhov from 1920 to 1929. Afanasievo burials have been found as far as Shatar Chuluu in central Mongolia, confirming a further expansion about 1,500 km beyond the Altai Mountains. The Afanasievo culture is now considered an integral part of the Prehistory of Western and Central Mongolia.

According to David W. Anthony the Afanasevan population was descended from people who migrated c. 3700–3300 BCE across the Eurasian Steppe from the pre-Yamnaya Repin culture of the Don-Volga region. It is considered to be "intrusive from the west", in respect to previous local Siberian cultures. According to Anthony, "The Afanasievo culture migration to the Altai was carried out by people with a Repin-type material culture, probably from the middle Volga-Ural region."

A 2021 study by F. Zhang and others found that early Tarim mummies from the late 3rd and early 2nd millennia BCE were unrelated to the Afanasevians, and came from a genetically isolated population derived from Ancient North Eurasians, that had borrowed agricultural and pastoral practices from neighboring peoples.

Because of its geographical location and dating, Anthony and earlier scholars such as Leo Klejn, J. P. Mallory and Victor H. Mair have linked the Afanasevans to the Proto-Tocharian language. Afanasievan ancestry persisted in Dzungaria at least until the second half of the 1st millennium BCE. The Shirenzigou culture (410–190 BC), just northeast of the Tarim Basin, also appears to have been derived from the Afanasievans, which, in addition to linguistics, further reinforces an Afanasievo hypothesis for the Tocharians.

== Archaeological sites ==
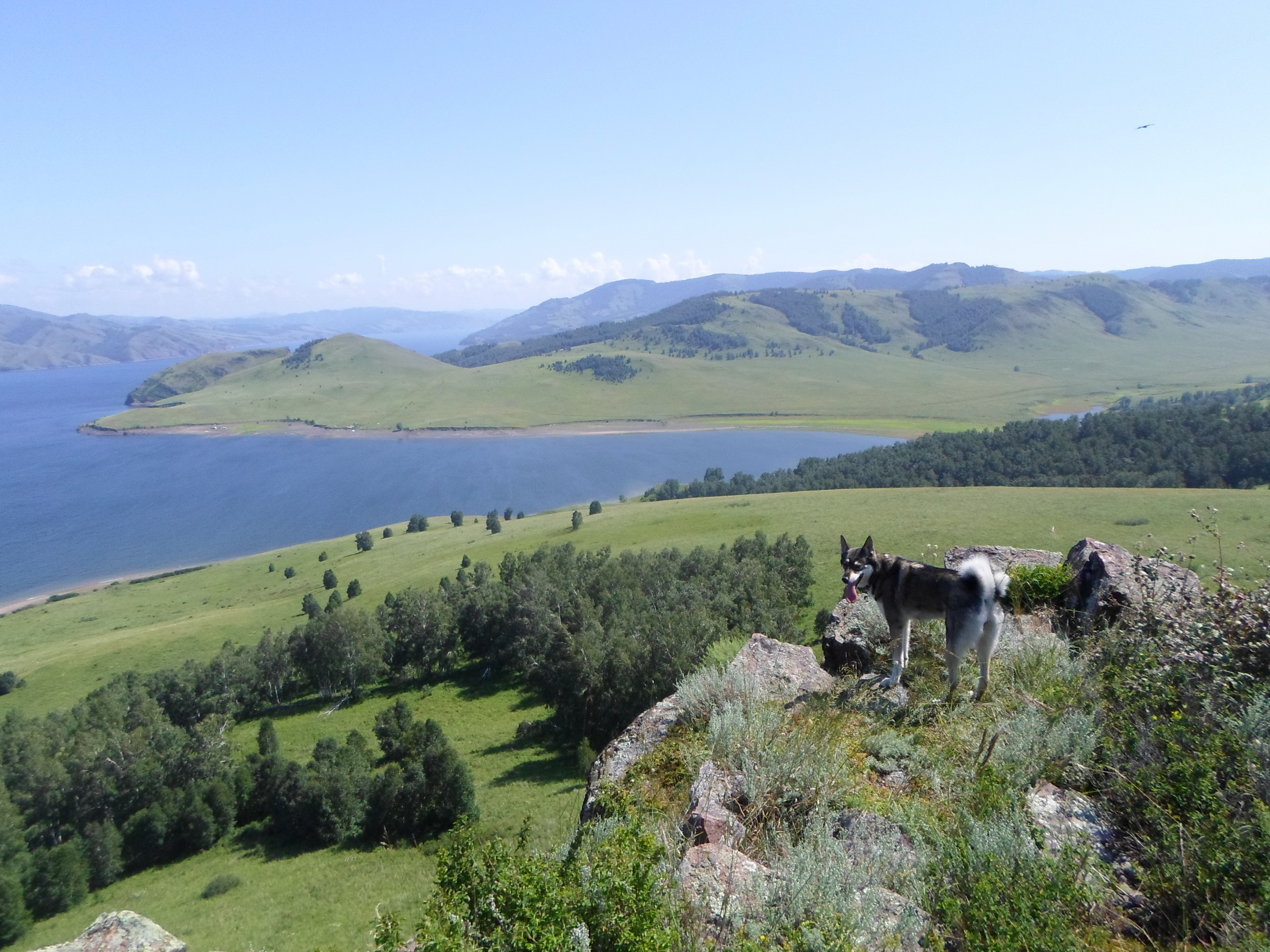
Gora Afanasieva (Minusinsk Basin).

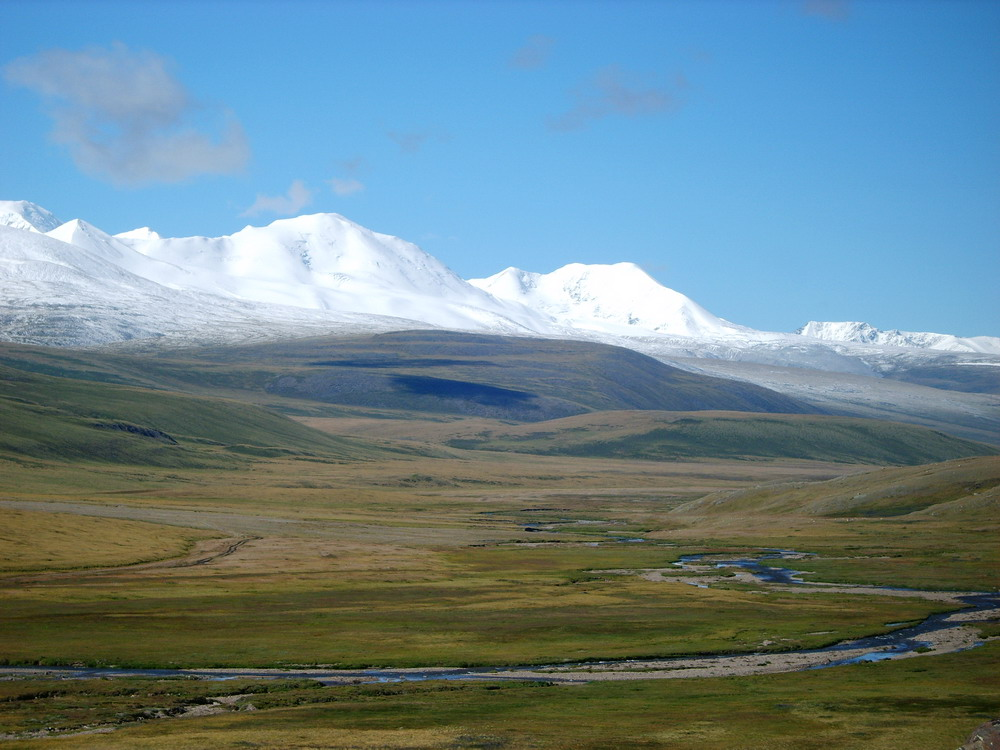
Ukok Plateau
(Altai Mountains)

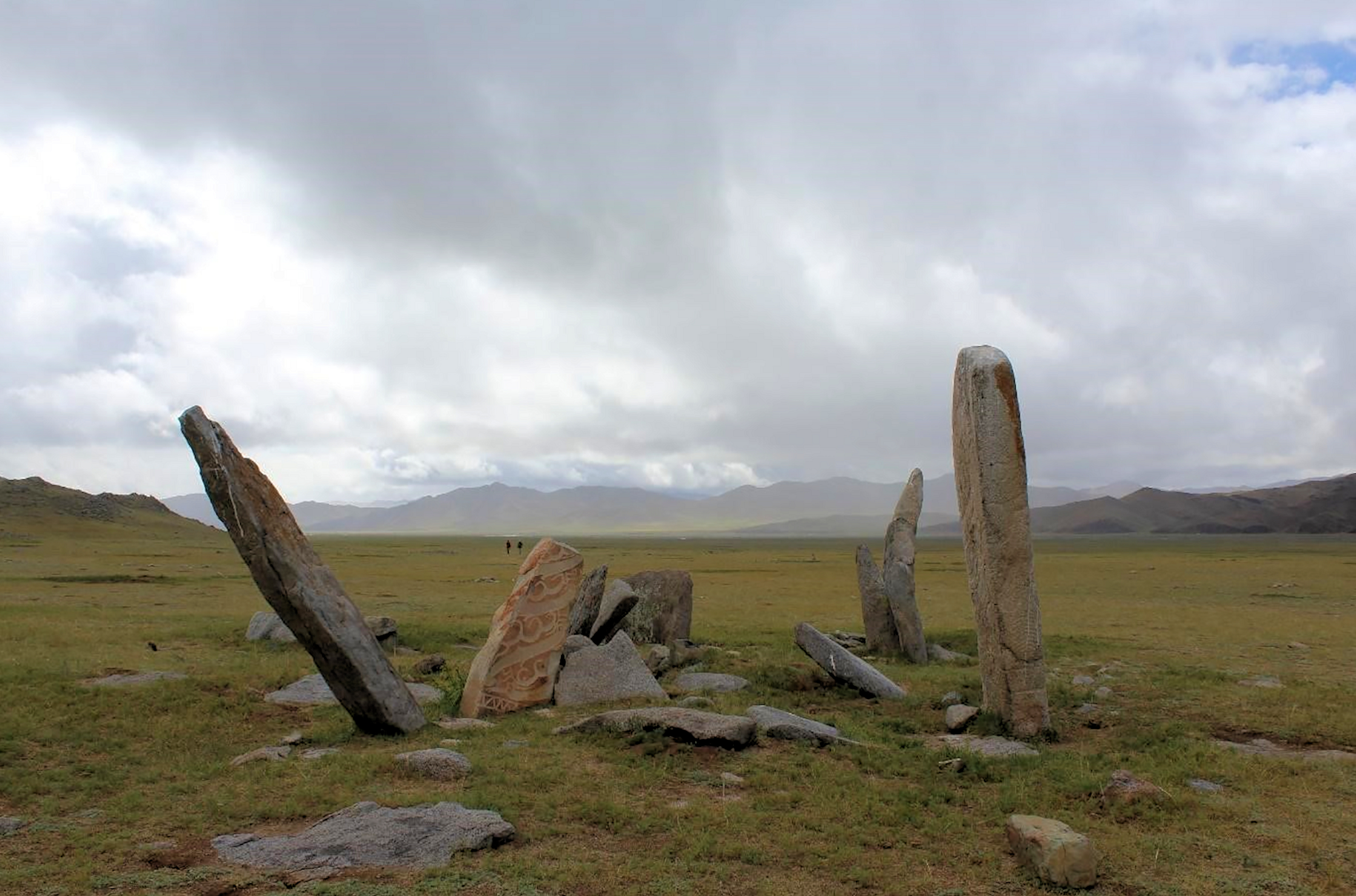
Shatar Chuluu
(Central Mongolia)

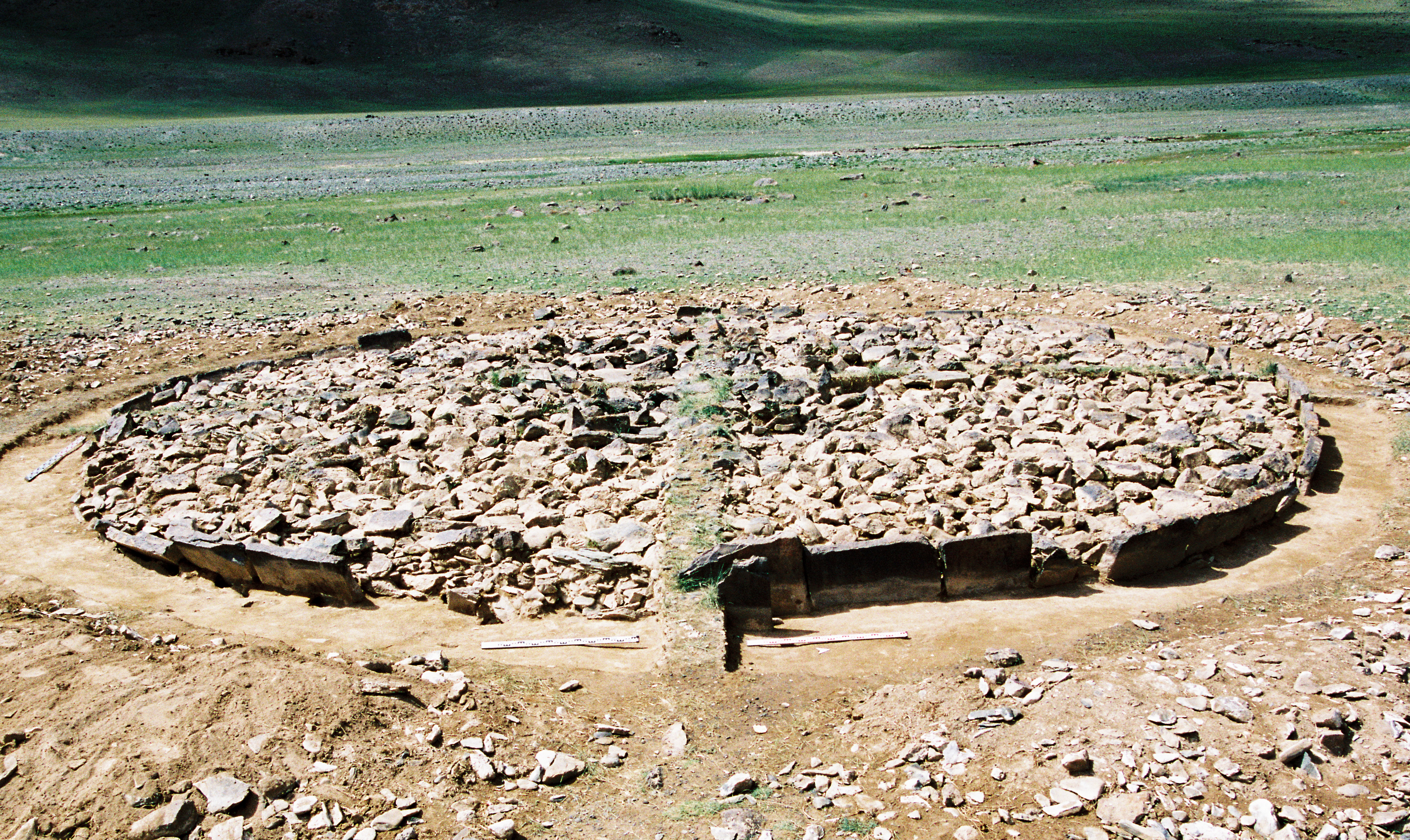
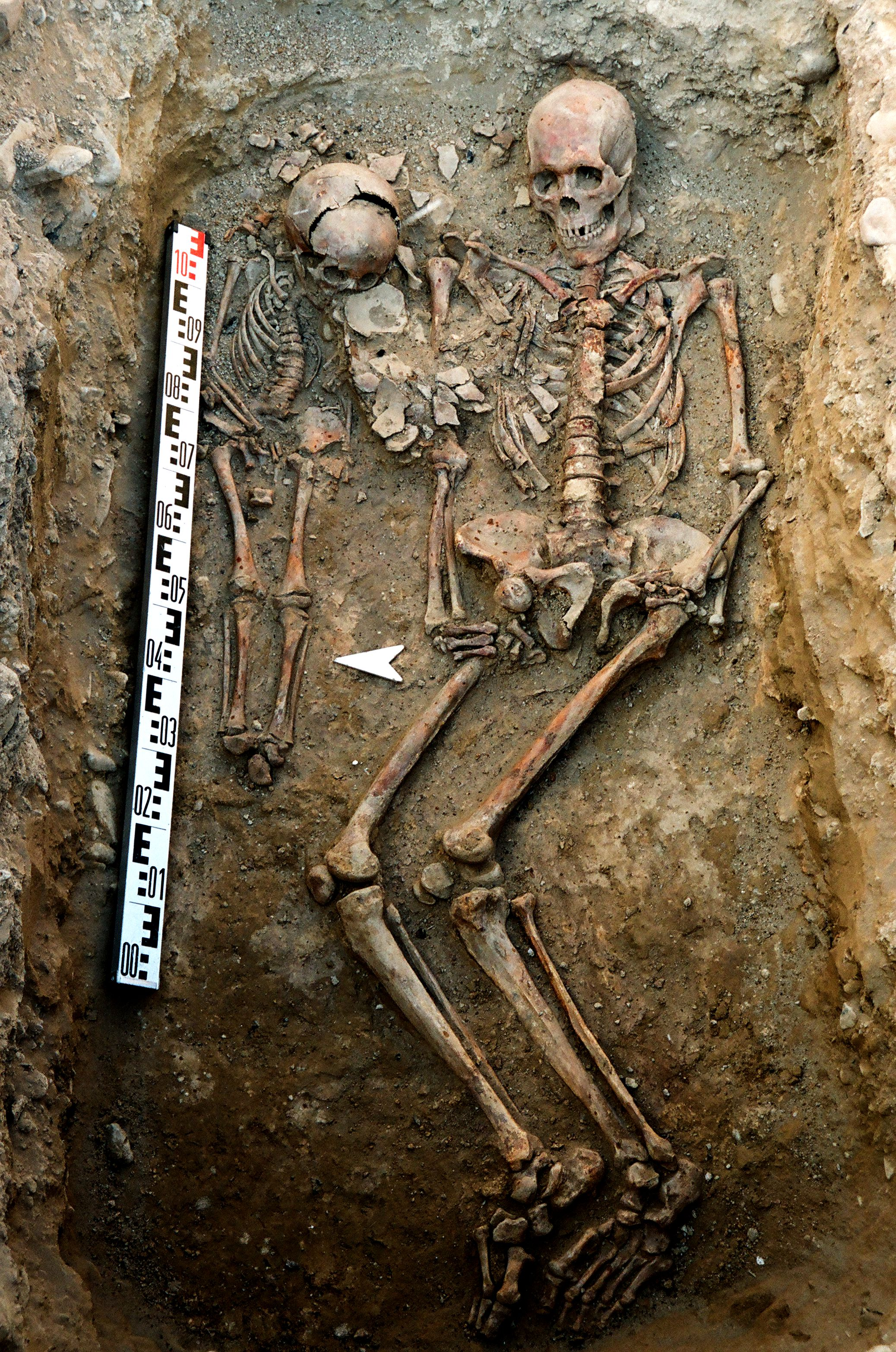
Afanasyevo burial at Khuurai Gobi 1, Bayan-Ölgii Province, western Mongolia, circa 3000 BCE.

The first Afanasievo archaeological site was found near the mountain of Gora Afanasieva (Minusinsk Basin). It was excavated in 1920–1929 by Russian archaeologist Sergei Teploukhov, and the newly discovered culture was named after the mountain. The original Afanasievo site was on the first floodplain terrace of the Yenisei river near Gora Afanasieva, 1 km to the southeast from the village of Bateni-Yarki, and is now submerged in the flood zone of the Krasnoyarsk Reservoir since 1960–1967.

Many other Afanasievo sites were found in the Ukok Plateau, and as far south as the area around Ürümqi (Tuqiu), near the Tarim Basin, and the area of Dzungaria.

The area from the Minusinsk Basin to Dzungaria is the main area of Afanasievo occupation, but recently, Afanasievo burials were found as far east as Altan Sandal and Shatar Chuluu in central Mongolia, confirming an eastward expansion about 1,500 km beyond the Altai Mountains and beyond the previously known area of occupation.

While the Afanasievo culture was present in the Altai and western and central Mongolia, elements of a distinct neolithic culture were present in eastern Mongolia during the period of Prehistoric Mongolia.

=== Dating ===
Conventional archaeological understanding tended to date the Afanasievo culture at around 2500–2000 BC. However radiocarbon gave dates as early as 3705 BC on wooden tools and 2874 BC on human remains. The earliest of these dates have now been rejected, giving a date of around 3300 BC for the start of the culture, and 2500 BC for its termination.

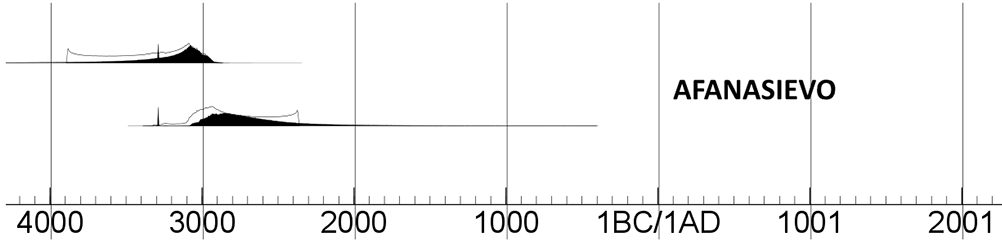
Carbon dating of Afanasievo burials.

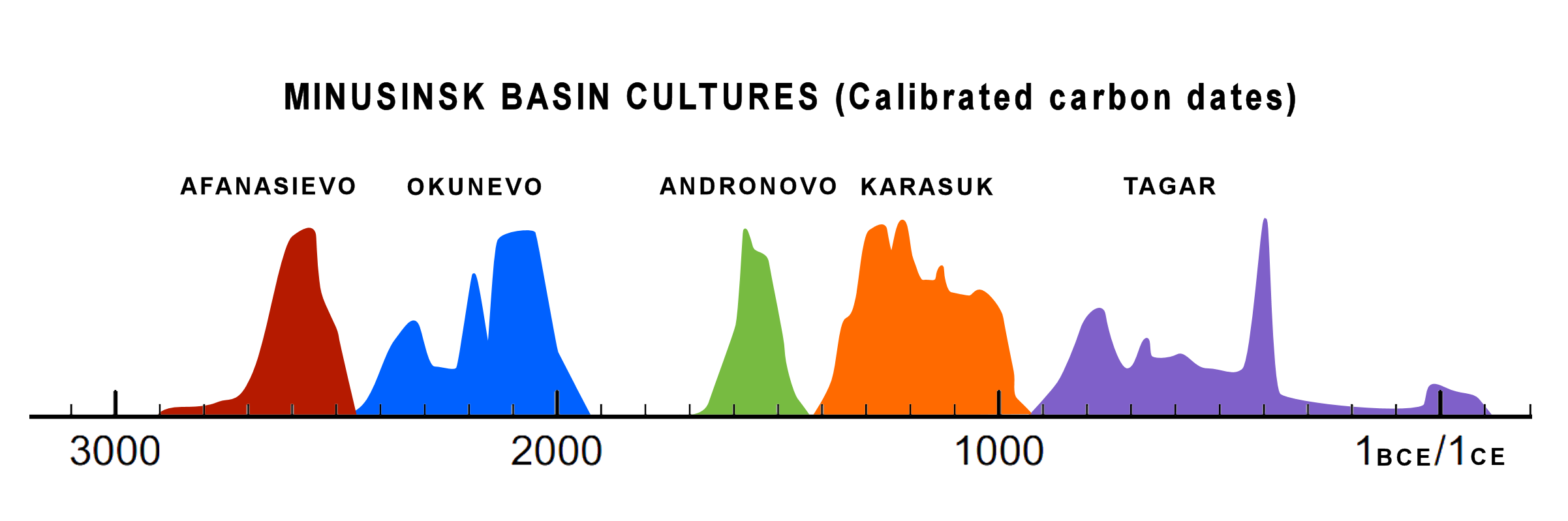
Minusinsk Basin cultures.

== Culture ==
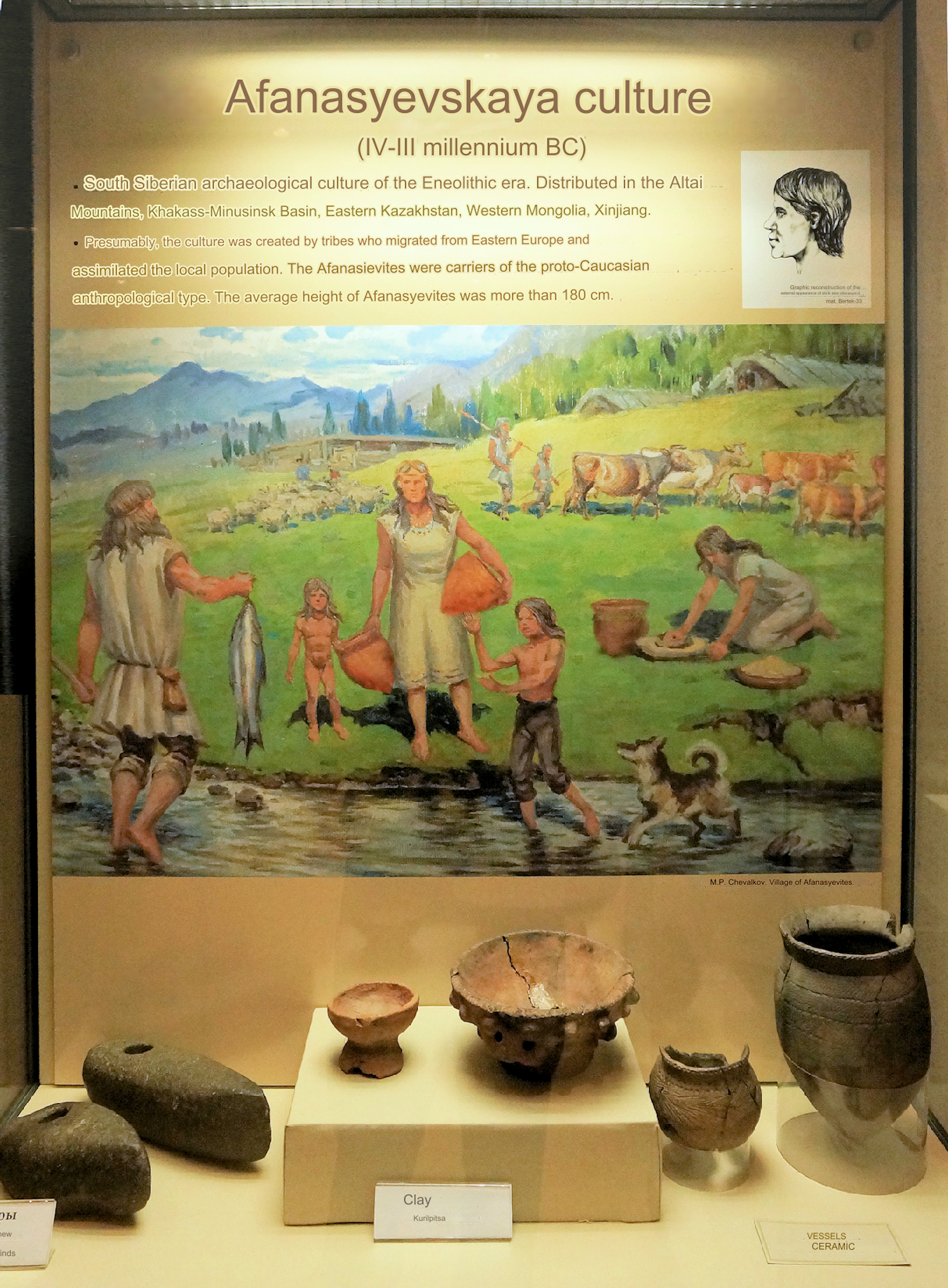
Afanasievo culture display in the National Museum of the Altai Republic (translated)

Mass graves were not usual for this culture. Afanasievo cemeteries include both single and small collective burials with the deceased usually flexed on their back in a pit. The burial pits are arranged in rectangular, sometimes circular, enclosures marked by stone walls. It has been argued that the burials represent family burial plots with four or five enclosures constituting the local social group.

The Afanasievo economy included cattle, sheep, and goat. Horse remains, either wild or domestic, have also been found. The Afanasievo people became the first food-producers in the area. Tools were manufactured from stone (axes, arrowheads), bone (fish-hooks, points) and antler. Among the antler pieces are objects that have been identified as possible cheek-pieces for horses. Artistic representations of wheeled vehicles found in the area has been attributed to the Afanasievo culture. Ornaments of copper, silver and gold have also been found.

The Afanasievans are now considered to be the earliest herders of East Asia, who were instrumental in the establishment of the long tradition of pastoralism in Mongolia. Their rise also corresponds with the appearance of domesticated sheep, goats, and cattle, which marks the earliest spread of Near Eastern domesticated animals and pastoralism to Inner Asia.

They also introduced the initial practice of copper and bronze metallurgy. Afanasievo burials include metal artifacts in copper, bronze (awls, knives), gold and silver, as well the remains of disassembled carts. The Afanasievos may have used cattle-drawn wagons, as did Yamnaya communities.

== Gallery ==
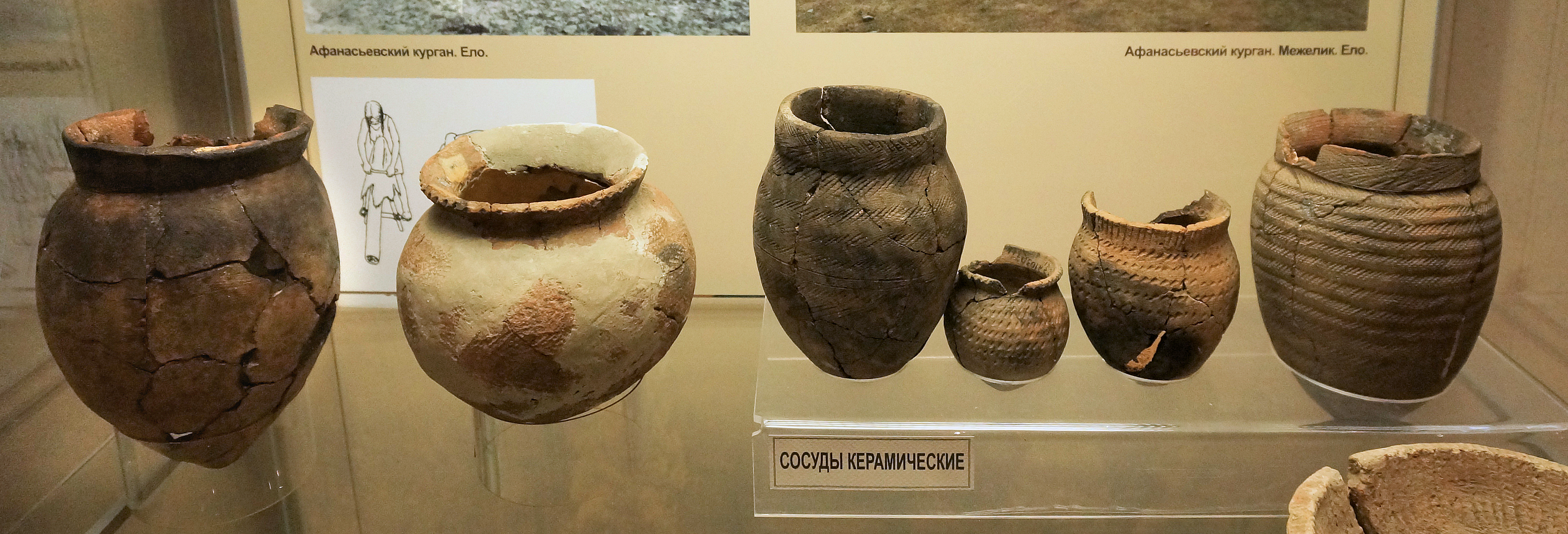
Afanasievo ceramic vessels, National Museum of the Altai Republic

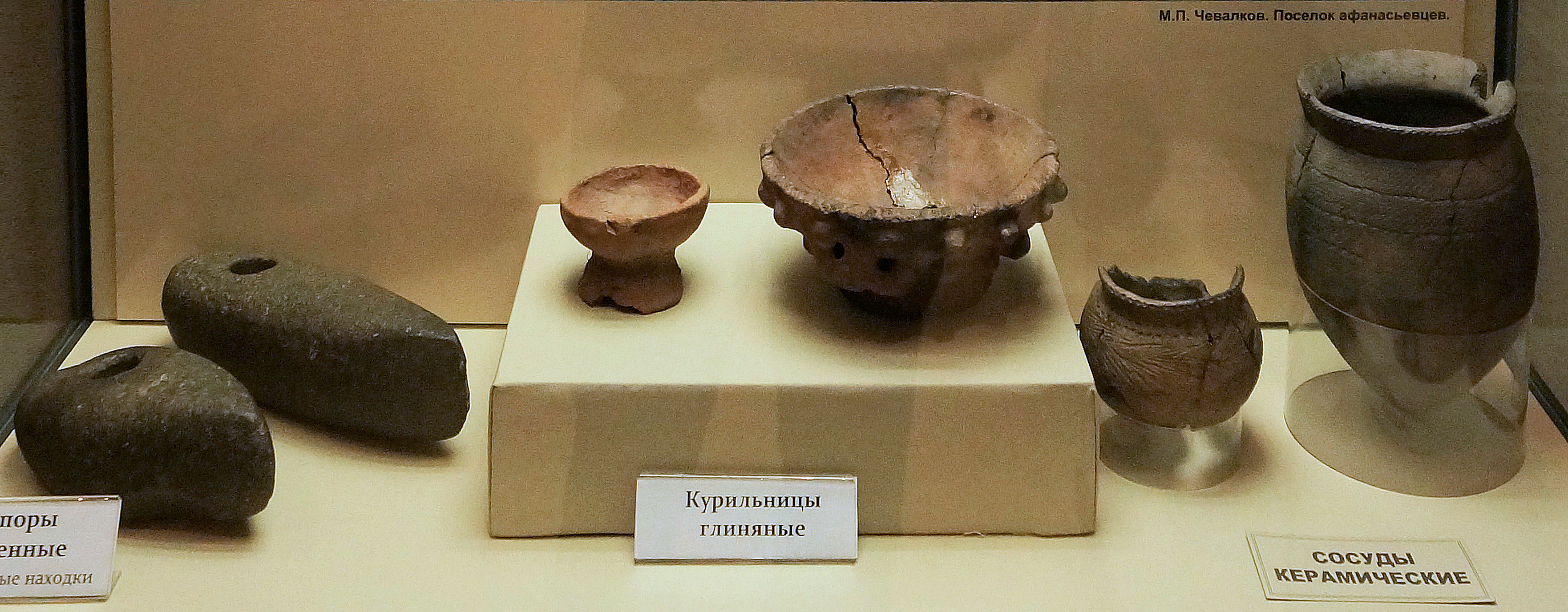
Afanasievo utensils, National Museum of the Altai Republic

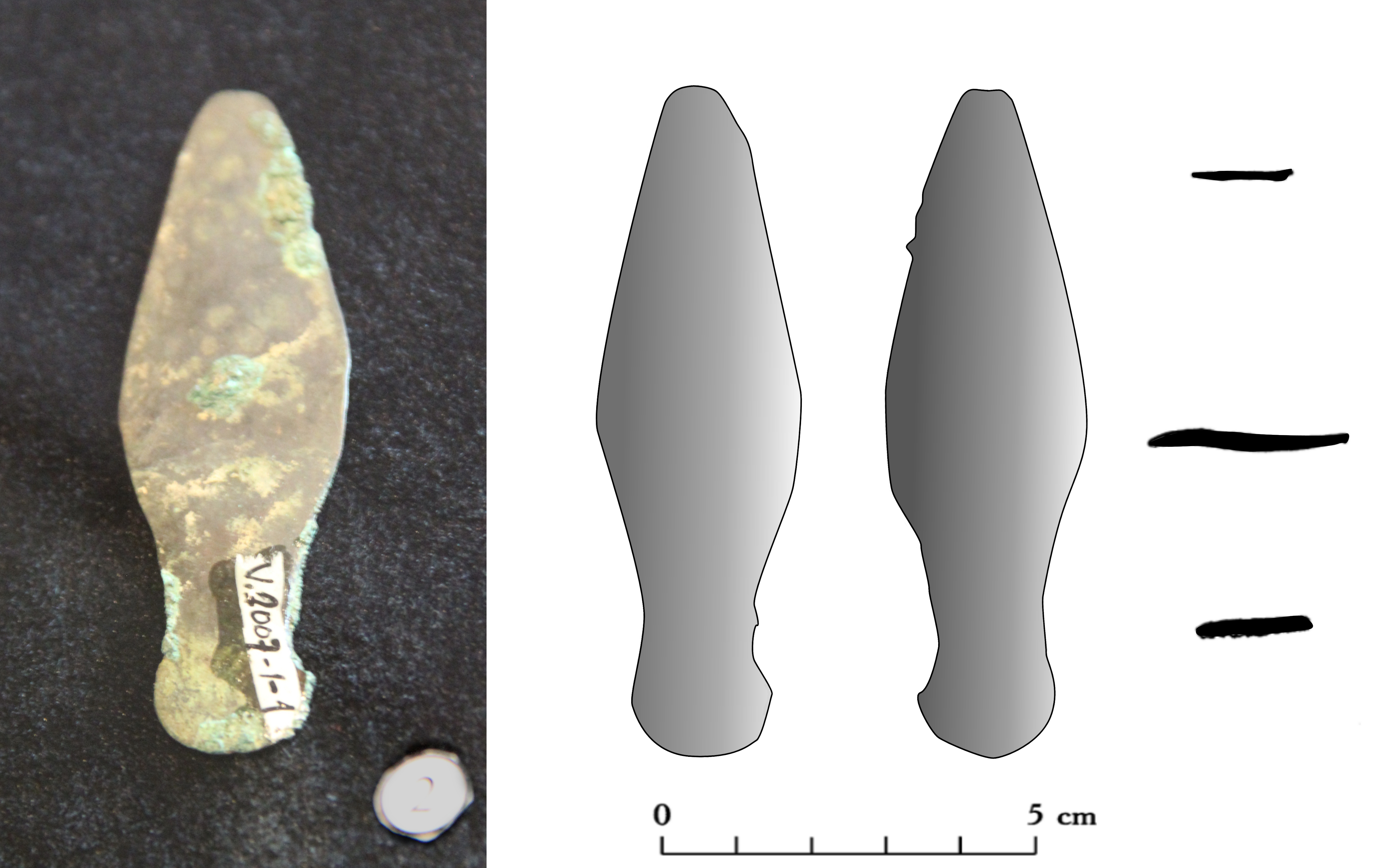
Bronze knife from the Afanasievo burial of Khuurai Gobi, Bayan-Ölgii Province, 3000 BCE. National Museum of Mongolia.

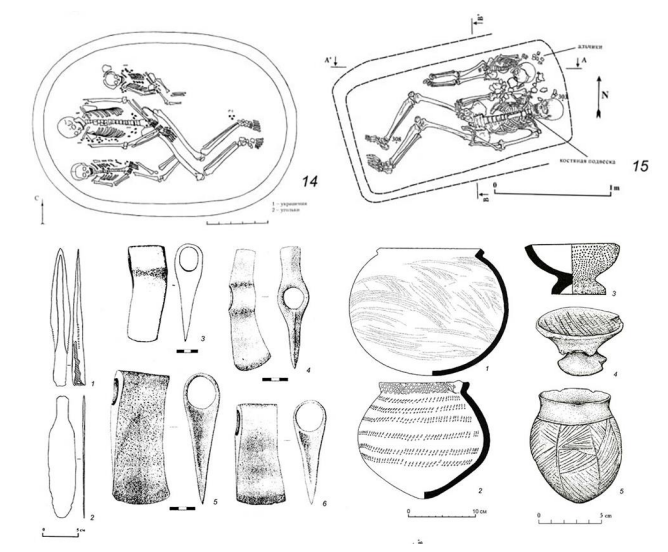
Afanasievo metalwork, ceramics and burials

=== Contemporary petroglyphs ===
Petroglyphs of animals are associated to the area and period of the Afanasievo culture and share similarities with petroglyphs found in western and central Asia.

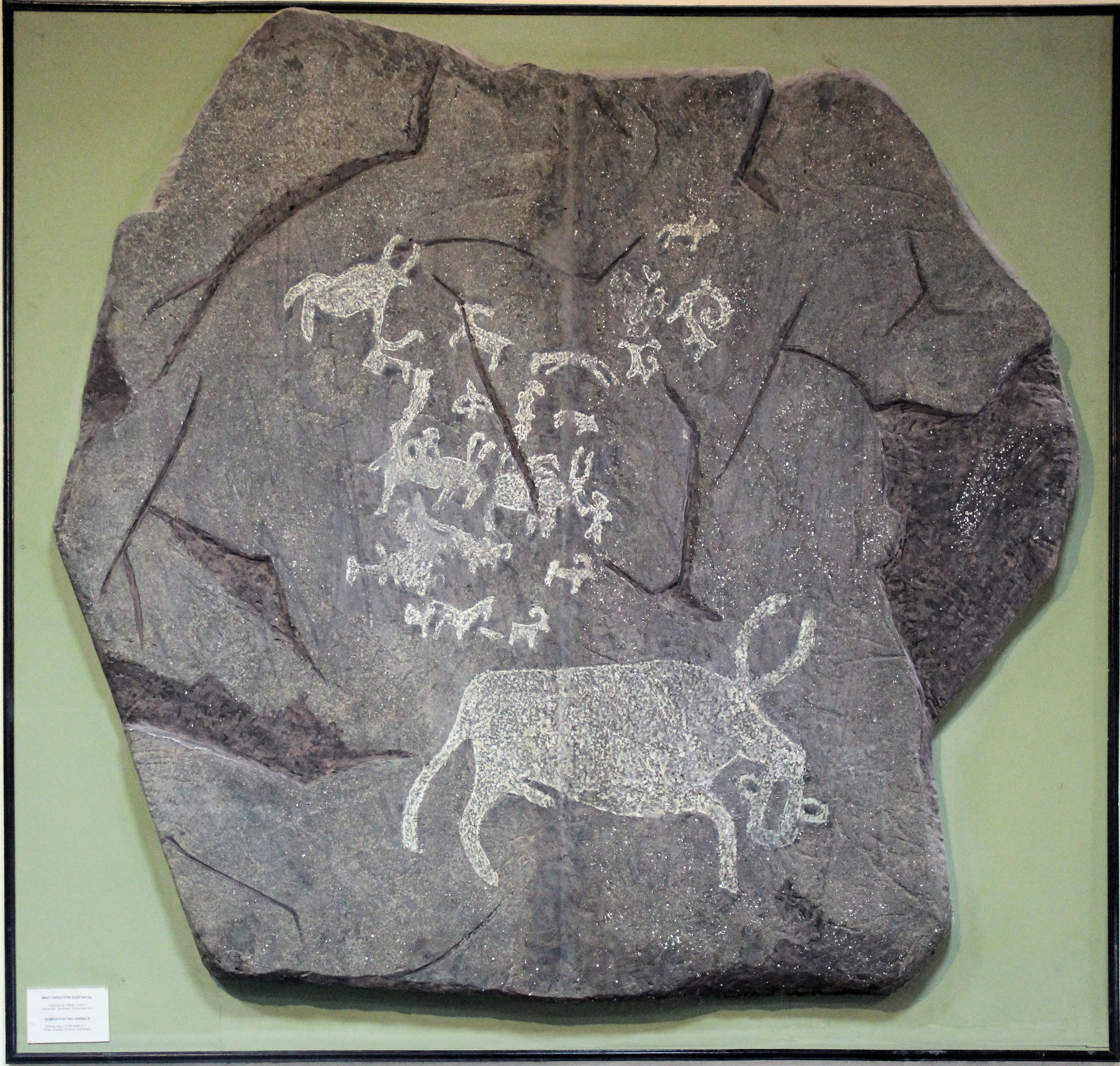
Animal hunting, 3000 BCE, Arkhangai Province, Mongolia. National Museum of the Altai Republic

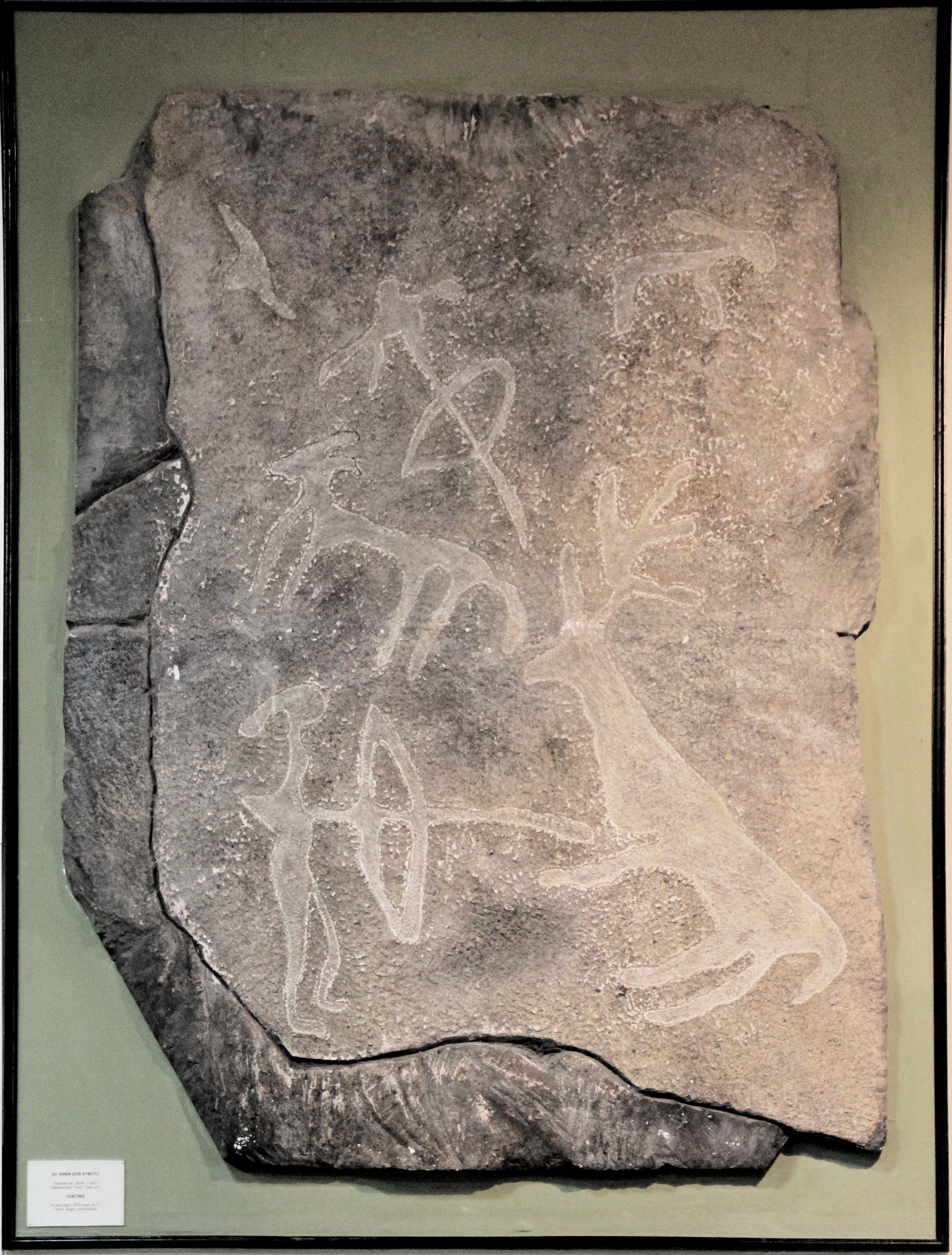
Animal hunting, 3000 BCE, Övörkhangai Province, Mongolia. National Museum of the Altai Republic

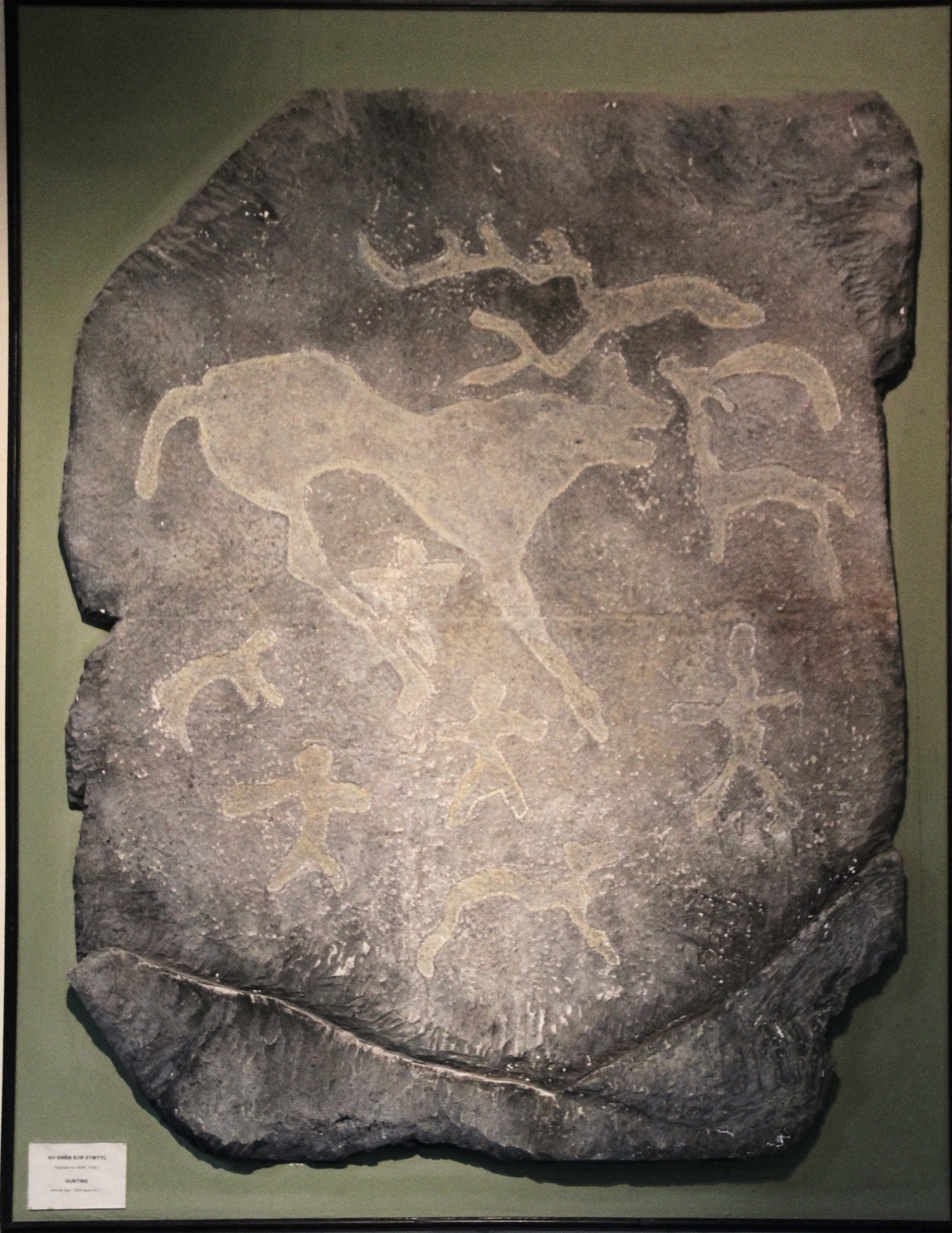
Animal hunting, 3000 BCE, Mongolia. National Museum of the Altai Republic

== Genetics ==
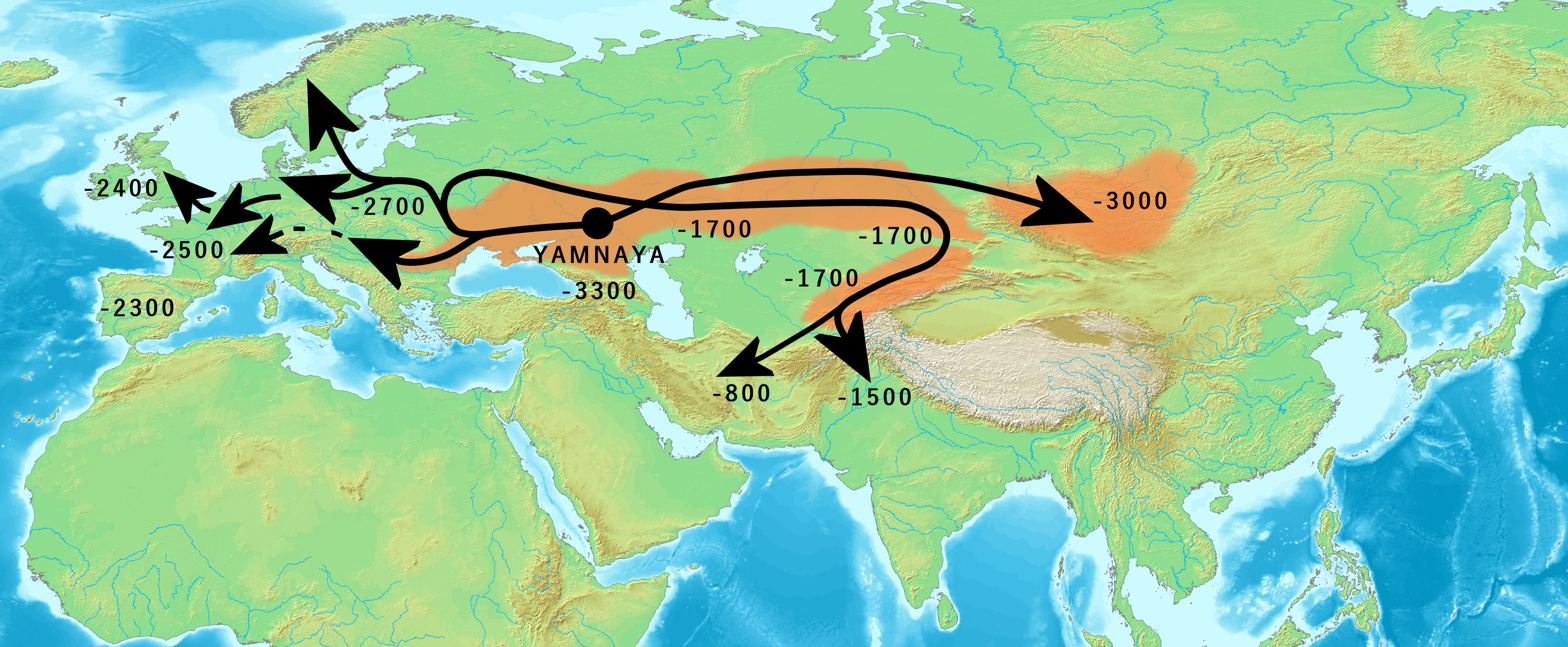
Migration of Yamnaya-related people, according to Anthony (2007), 2017; Narasimhan et al. (2019); Nordqvist and Heyd (2020):
- 3000 BC: Initial eastward migration initiating the Afanasievo culture, possibly Proto-Tocharian.
- 2900 BC: North-westward migrations carrying Corded Ware culture, transforming into Bell Beaker; according to Anthony, westward migration west of Carpathians into Hungary as Yamnaya, transforming into Bell Beaker, possibly ancestral to Italo-Celtic (disputed).
- 2700 BC: Second eastward migration starting east of Carpathian mountains as Corded Ware, transforming into Fatyanovo-Balanova (2800 BCE) -> Abashevo (2200 BCE)-> Sintashta (2100–1900 BCE)-> Andronovo (1900–1700 BCE) -> Indo-Aryans.

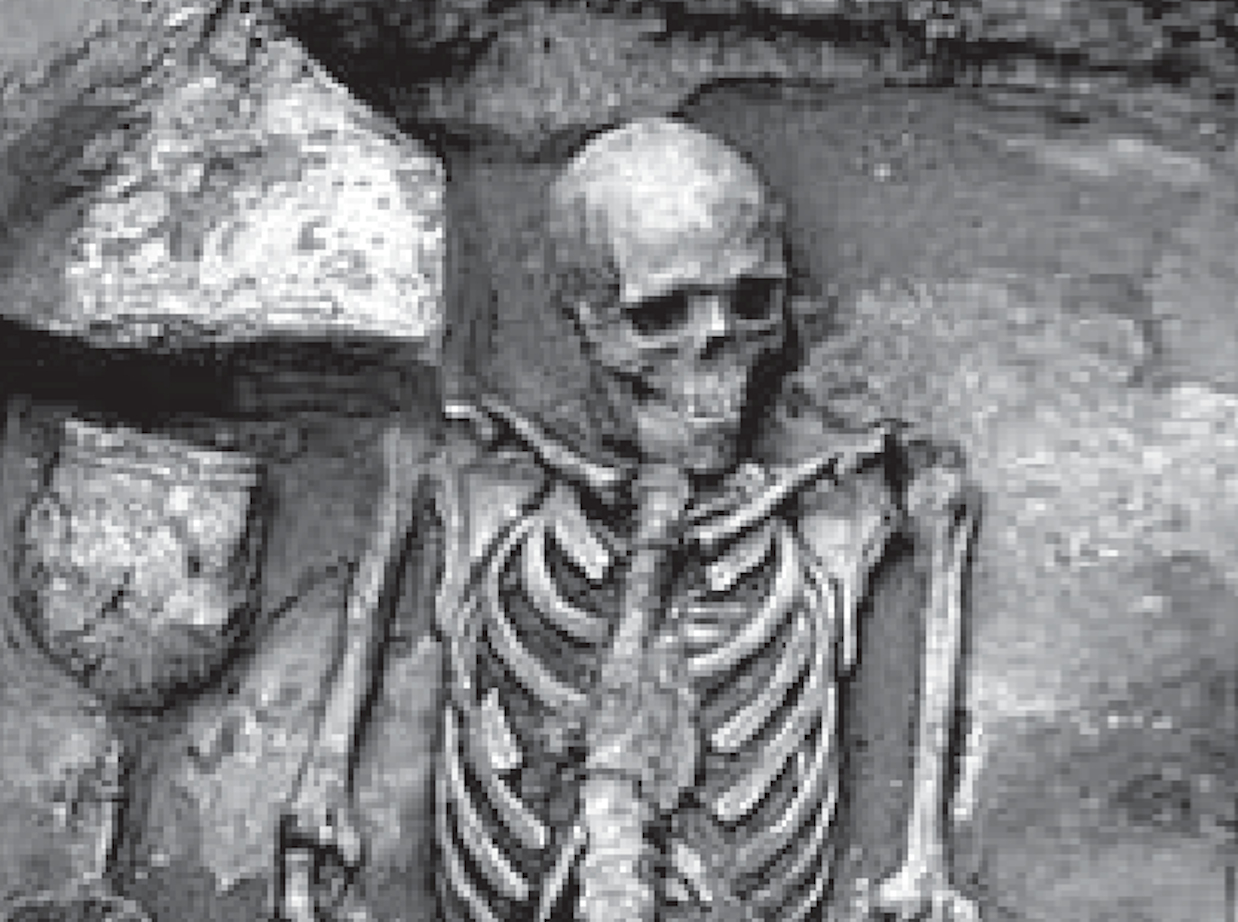
Afanasievo individual, Bertek-33, Kurgan 3, Ukok Plateau

The analysis of the full genome of Afanasievo individuals has shown that they were genetically very close to the Yamnaya population of the Pontic–Caspian steppe. The Afanasievo and Yamnaya populations were much more similar to each other than to groups geographically located between the two (which unlike Afanasievo samples carried a large amount of ancestry from eastern Siberian hunter-gatherers). This indicates that the Afanasievo culture was brought to the Altai region via migration from the western Eurasian steppe, which occurred with little admixture from local populations.

From the Altai mountains, steppe-derived Afanasievo ancestry spread to the east into Mongolia and to the south into Xinjiang. The Yamnaya-related lineages and ancestry in Afanasievo disappeared in the course of the Bronze Age in the Altai region and Mongolia, being replaced by the migrating populations from the Sintashta culture arriving from the west. In Dzungaria, Afanasievo-related ancestry persisted at least into the late first millennium BCE.

The Afanasievo people, accompanied by their pastoralist technologies, are one of the major foreign contributors to the genetic profile of the modern northwestern Chinese.

=== Paternal haplogroups ===
The genetic closeness of the Yamnaya and Afanasievo populations is also mirrored in the uniparental haplogroups, especially in the predominance of the Y-chromosome haplogroup R1b. (Note: Allentoft et al. (2015) sampled four females from the Afanasievo culture, two individuals carried mtDNA haplogroup J2a2a, one carried T2c1a2, and one carried U5a1a1. Narasimhan et al. (2019) analyzed the remains of 24 individuals ascribed to the Afanasievo culture. Of the 14 samples of Y-DNA extracted, 10 belonged to R1b1a1a2a2, 1 to R1b1a1a2a, and 3 belonged to Q1a2. The mtDNA samples belonged to subclades of U (particularly of U5), along with T, J, H and K.)

=== Maternal haplogroups ===
A 2018 study analyzed the maternal haplogroups of 7 Afanasievo specimens. 71% belonged to West Eurasian maternal haplogroups U, H and R, while 29% belonged to the East Eurasian maternal haplogroup C.

=== Populations east of the Afanasievans ===
Afanasievo burials are recorded as far as central Mongolia, at the sites of Altan Sandal and Shatar Chuluu. To their east, in the modern area of eastern Mongolia and beyond, resided Neolithic cultures of Prehistoric Mongolia, probably derived from the Ancient Northeast Asians, who were the predecessors of the Slab Grave culture of eastern Mongolia.

== Paleoepidemiology ==
At Afanasevo Gora, two strains of Yersinia pestis have been extracted from human teeth. One is dated 2909–2679 BCE; the other, 2887–2677 BCE. Both are from the same (mass) grave of seven people, and are presumed near-contemporary. This strain's genes express flagellin, which triggers the human immune response; so it was not a bubonic plague.

== Possible links to other cultures ==
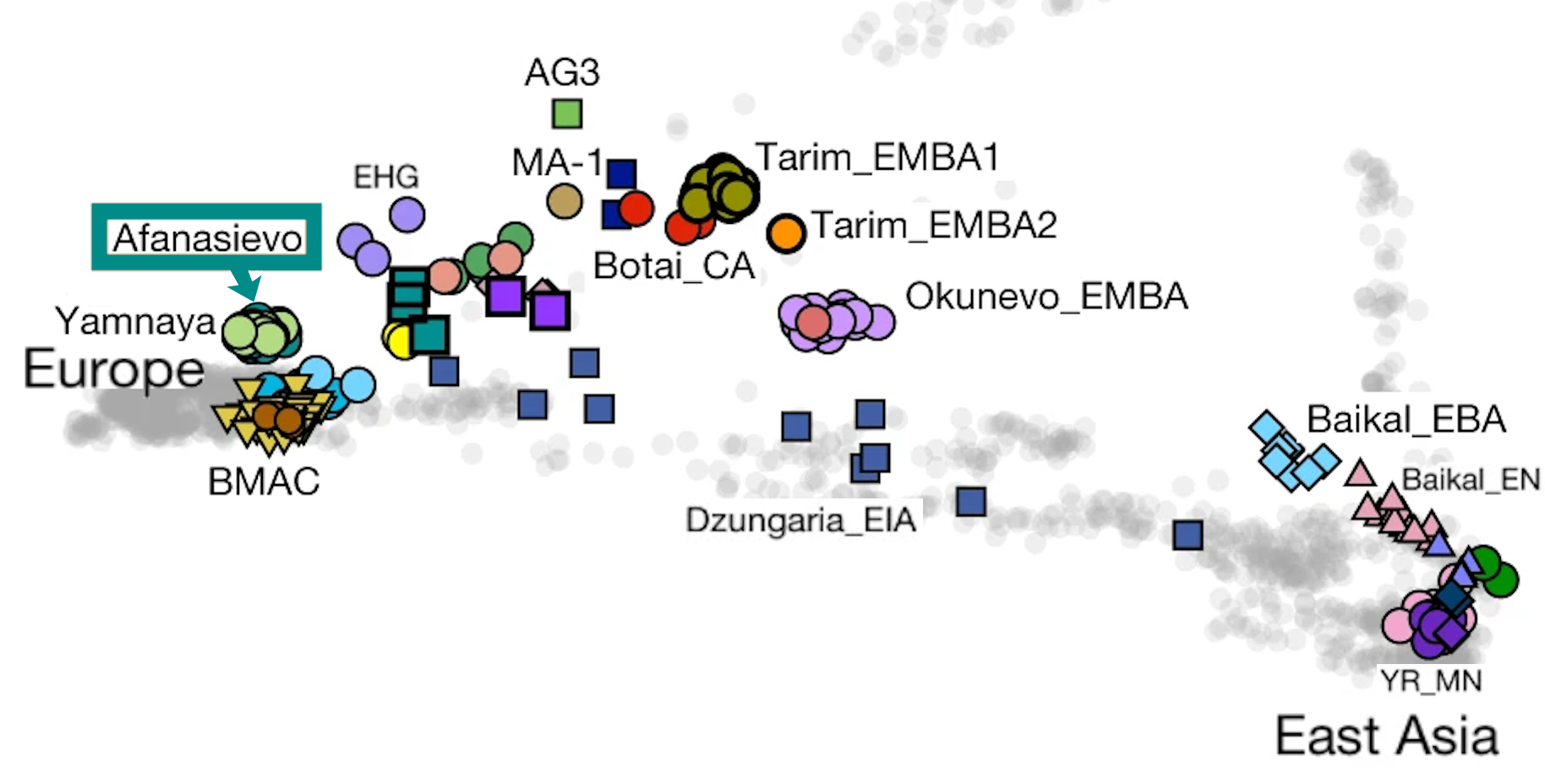
Genetic proximity of the Afanasievo culture (_{●}) with ancient (color) and modern (grey) populations. Primary Component Analysis (detail).

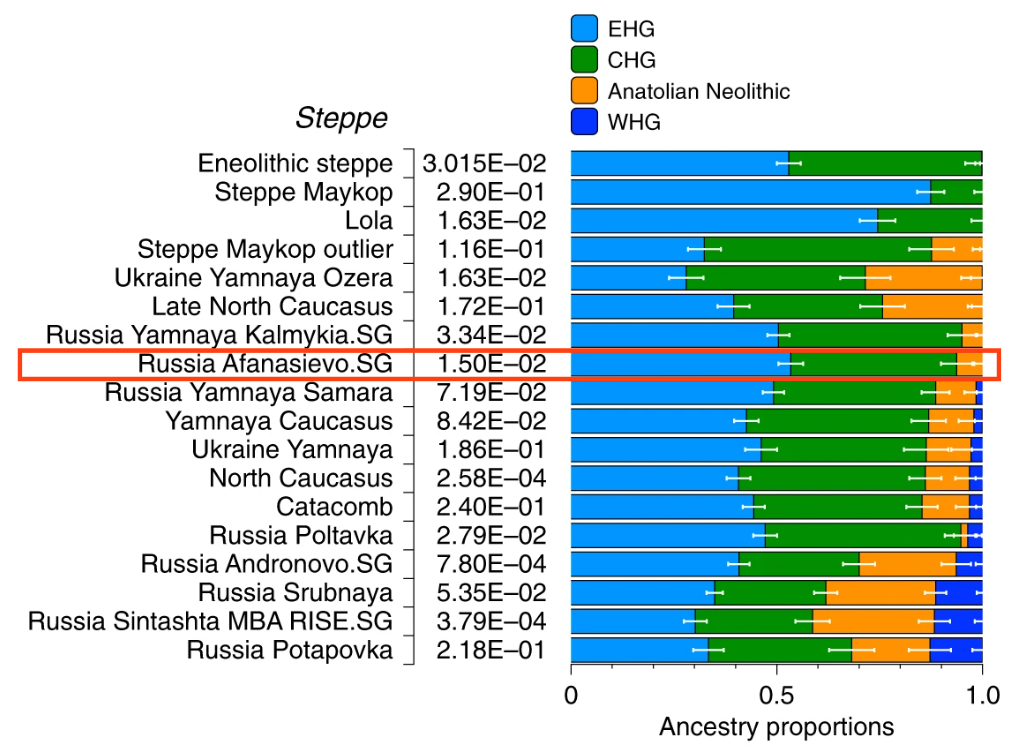
Admixture proportions of Afanasievo populations. They combined Eastern Hunter Gatherer ( EHG), Caucasian Hunter-Gatherer ( CHG) and Anatolian Neolithic ( ) ancestry, and were almost identical with Yamnaya people.

Because of its numerous traits attributed to the early Indo-Europeans, like metal-use, horses and wheeled vehicles, and cultural relations with Kurgan steppe cultures, the Afanasevans are believed to have been Indo-European-speaking. They were genetically similar to the Yamnaya populations of Western Steppe Herders. Genetic studies have demonstrated a discontinuity between Afanasievo and the succeeding Siberian-originating Okunevo culture, as well as genetic differences between Afanasievo and the Tarim mummies. A genomic study published in 2021 found that the population of earliest Tarim Basin cultures (the Tarim mummies, dated to c. 2000 BCE) had high levels of Ancient North Eurasian ancestry and no connection with Afanasievo populations. Recent genetic studies have shown that individuals from the early Bronze Age of Dzungaria are largely descended from Afanasievo herders, with additional ancestry from Afontova Gora, Tarim_EMBA and Baikal_EBA. The Chemurchek pastoral culture of the early Bronze Age, which succeeded the Afanasievo in both the Dzungar Basin and the Altai Mountains, derived about two-thirds of its ancestry from the aforementioned Bronze Age individuals of Dzungaria, while the rest came from sources related to Tarim_EMBA and BMAC.

Numerous scholars have suggested that the Afanasievo culture may be responsible for the introduction of metallurgy to China. In particular, contacts between the Afanasievo culture and the Majiayao culture and the Qijia culture are considered for the transmission of bronze technology.

The Afanasievo culture may also display cultural borrowings from the earlier Banpo culture (c. 4000 BCE), particularly in the area of painted pottery, suggesting influence from the Far East, specifically from Neolithic China, on the Afanasievo culture and other cultural complexes in the Middle Yenisei region.

== Successors ==
In the Altai Mountains and to the southeast, Afanasievans seem to have coexisted with the early period of the Chemurchek culture for some time, as some of their burials are contemporary and some of the artifacts of the burials coincide.

To the north, the Afanasievo culture was succeeded by the Okunev culture, which is considered to be an extension of the Paleosiberian local non-Indo-European forest culture into the region. The Okunev culture nevertheless displays influences from the earlier Afanasievo culture. The region was subsequently occupied by the Andronovo, Karasuk, Tagar and Tashtyk cultures, respectively.

Allentoft et al. (2015) confirmed that the Afanasevo culture was replaced by the second wave of Indo-European migrations from the Andronovo culture during late Bronze Age and early Iron Age. (Note: According to Allentoft and coauthors (2015): "Afanasievo culture persisted in central Asia and, perhaps, Mongolia and China until they themselves were replaced by fierce warriors in chariots called the Sintashta (also known as the Andronovo culture)".) The Andronovo population was found to be genetically related, but clearly distinct from the Afanasievo population.

Several scholars propose the Afanasievo culture as the ancestors of the Tocharians, who lived on the northern edge of the Tarim Basin (in present-day Xinjiang, China) in the first millennium AD. The Tocharian languages are believed to have become extinct during the 9th century AD. The Indo-European speaking Tocharian peoples of the Tarim city-states then intermixed with the Uyghurs, whose Old Uyghur language spread through the region.

=== Shirenzigou culture (410-190 BCE) ===
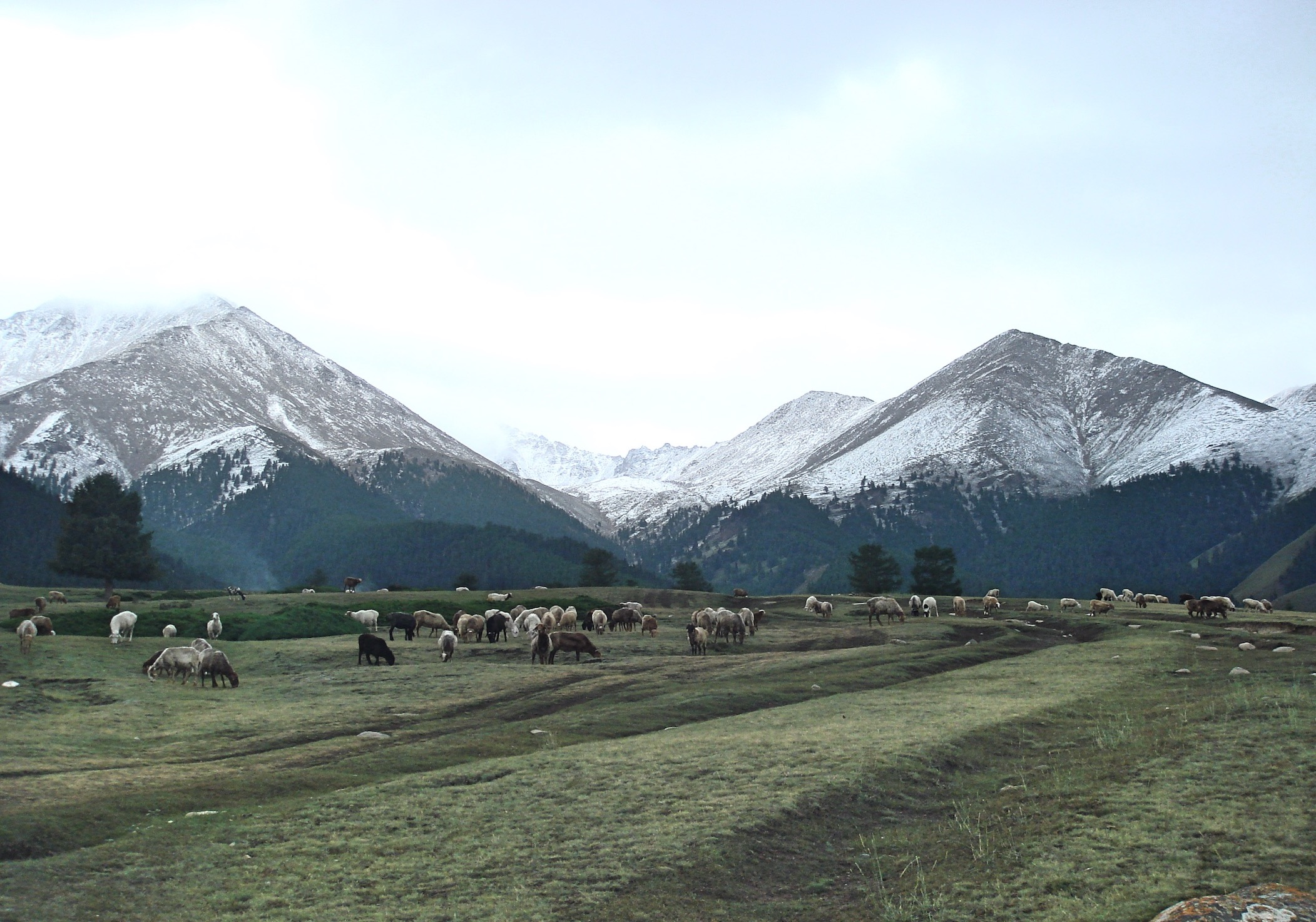
Surroundings of the Shirenzigou archaeological site in Barkol County

Genetic studies on Iron Age individuals of the Shirenzigou site dated to circa 200 BCE have shown a fairly balanced admixture between the West Eurasian and East Eurasian genetic pools. The West Eurasian component was Yamnaya-related, while the East Eurasian component was Northeast Asian-related. The Yamnaya component suggest a strong probability that the Shirenzigou populations were derived from the Afanasievo culture to the north, and spoke an Indo-European language. This reinforces an Afanasievo hypothesis for the Tocharians, often called the "Steppe hypotheses", rather than a hypotheses favouring BMAC and Andronovo Culture origins, the "Bactrian Oasis hypotheses".

== Notes ==
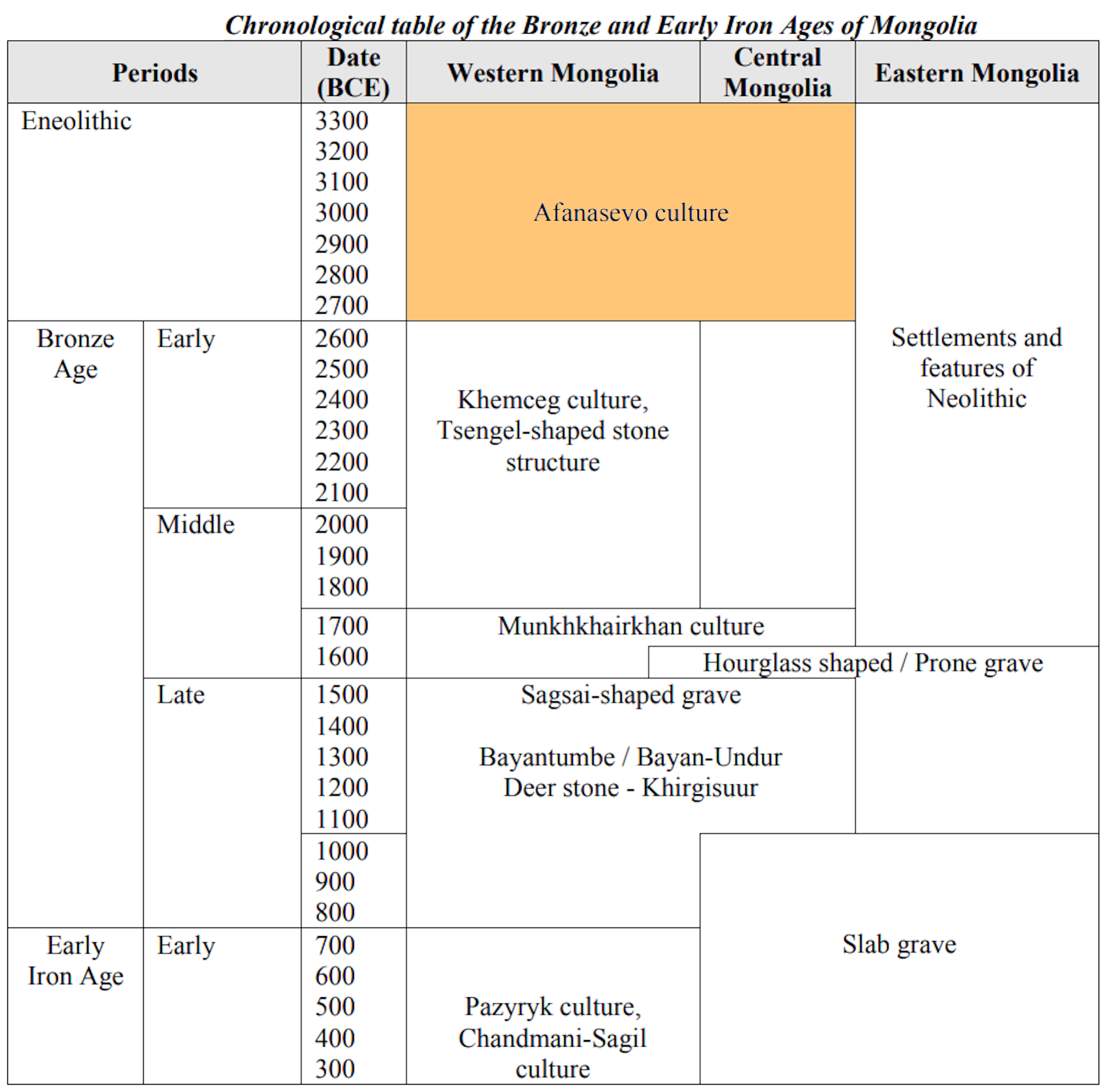
Timeline of Afanasievo and later cultures in western and central Mongolia
