= Karakol culture =

Altai area Bronze Age culture

Coordinates: 50°46′23″N 86°27′50″E

- Location of the Karakol culture, with main contemporary cultures
- Geographical range: Altai
- Period: Bronze Age
- Dates: c. 2000 BCE
- Preceded by: Afanasiev culture
- Followed by: Karasuk culture

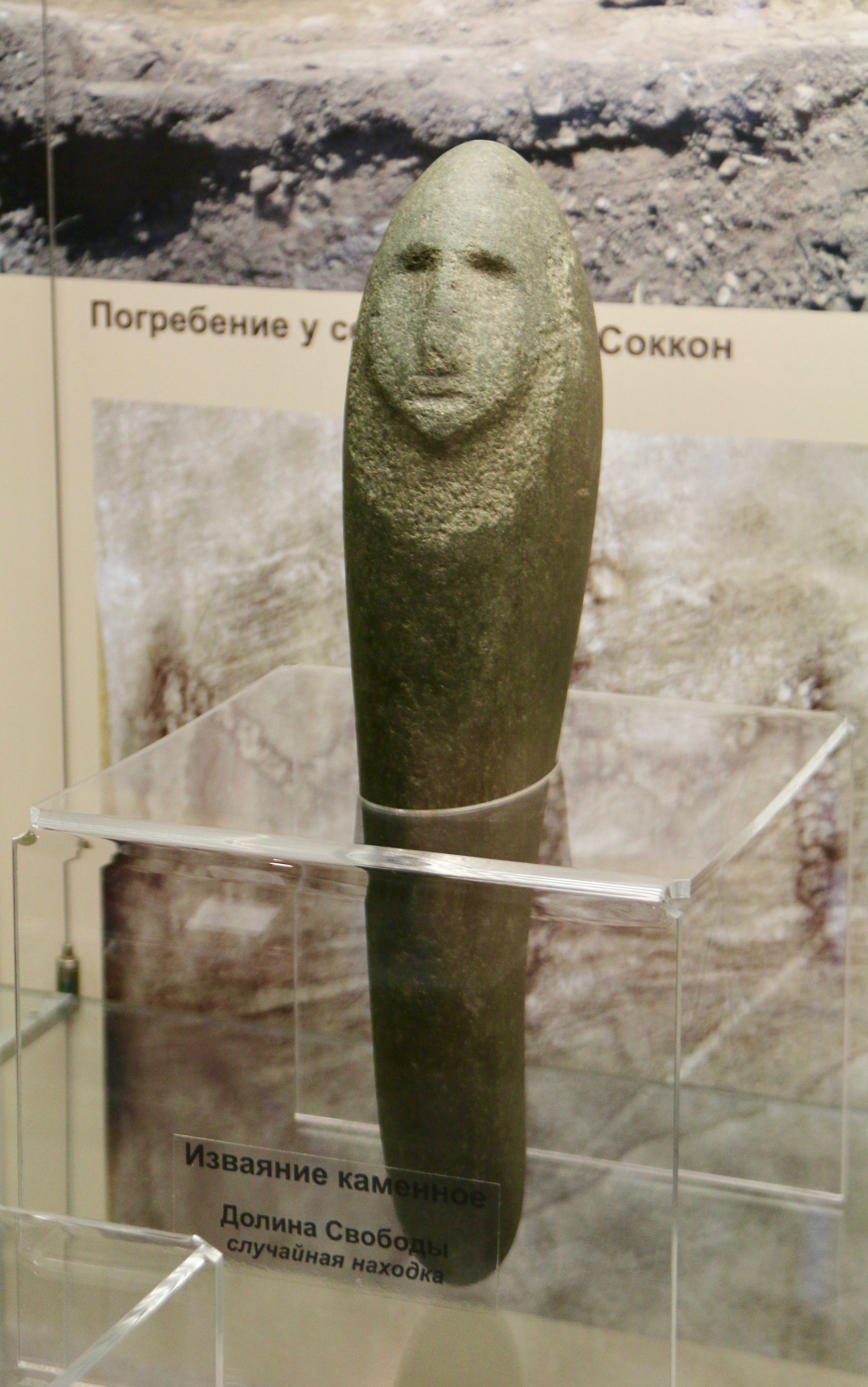
Karakol culture stone sculpture. Anokhin Museum, Gorno-Altaysk, Altai Republic, Siberia, Russia

Karakol culture (Russian: Каракольская культура Karakol'skaya kul'tura) is a Bronze Age archaeological culture of the 2nd millennium BCE in the Altai area, consecutive to the Afanasiev culture. Karakol culture was discovered in 1985 near village of Karakol in Altai. In the Altai territory, the Bronze Age extended from the 3rd to the 2nd millennium BCE, bronze was a main material for tools, weapons and jewelry. At that time in the Altai territory lived people of the Karakol and Afanasiev cultures. Most of the investigated Karakol culture burials are located on the banks of the river Ursul and its tributaries.

== Economy ==
In the Bronze Age, Altai populations transitioned from hunter-gathering to productive economy, from the hunting, plants-gathering and fishing to livestock-breeding and agriculture. The early Altaians in the summer grazed herds of cows, horses, and flocks of sheep and goats on alpine meadows, in the winter they were coming back to the river valleys; they also cultivated fields and grew millet, barley, rye, and other cereal plants.

== Archaeology ==
Burials were in kurgans with circular enclosures, some burials in stone boxes, and ground grave-pits enclosed with massive stone slabs. Grave inventory is found infrequently. People were buried in rectangular boxes of hewn stone slabs, with many slabs with round hollows or holes and decorated with drawings of colored mineral pigments on inner side. Deceased were laid head to the west, facing the east. Coloured pictures in red, black, and white depict anthropomorphous creatures with feather crowns or with horns, with anthropomorphous masks and with costumes and sleeve ornaments. The pictures of birds, goats, elks, and people were made by cutting point technique. According to researchers, depicted animals and fantastic creatures on the inner side of the slabs "carried" the deceased to the afterlife. One of the figures depicted a man with a dog's head.

The stone vaults of Karakol culture contain coals and ashes. This element of the spiritual and religious culture is preserved in the Altai Mountains to this day. The modern Altaian ritual practices include fire for ritual cleansing.

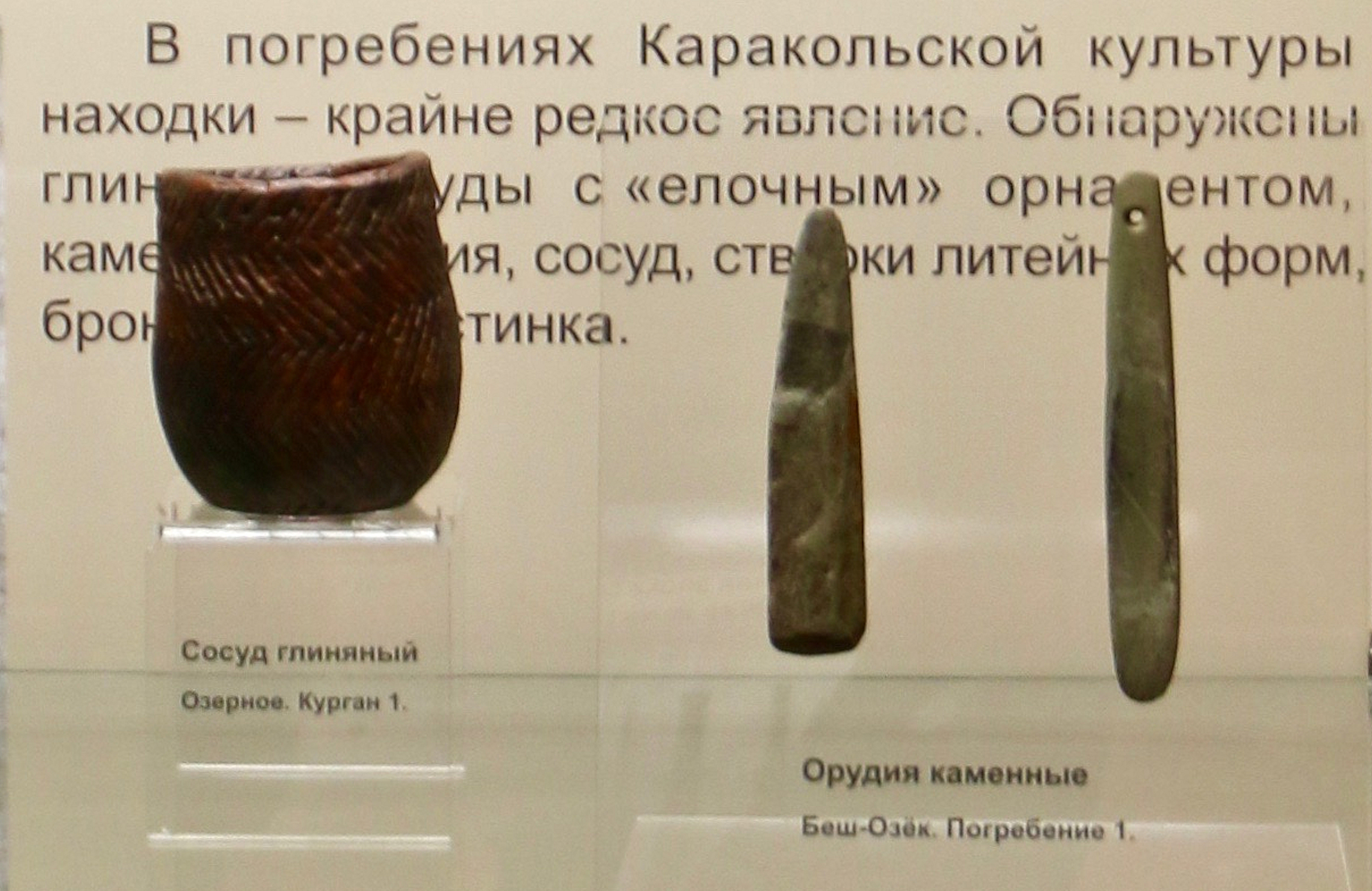
Karakol culture artifacts

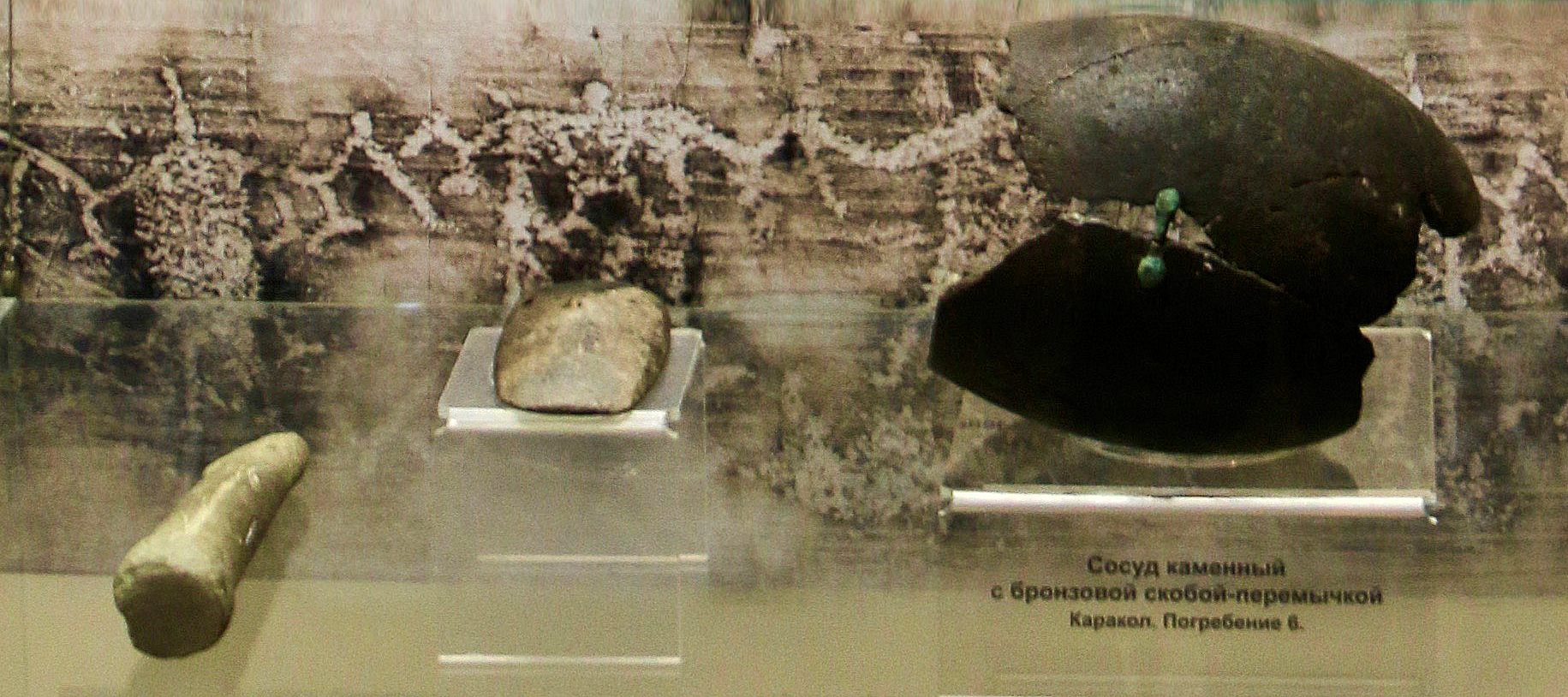
Karakol culture artifacts

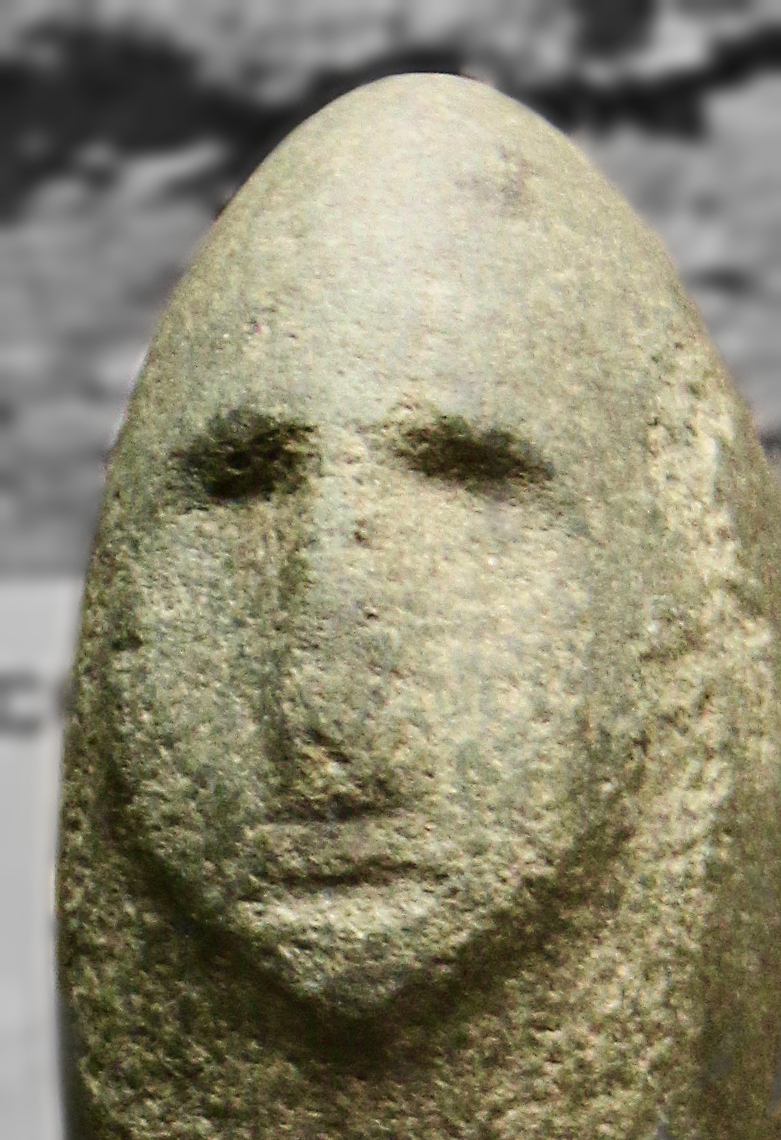
Karakol culture portrait

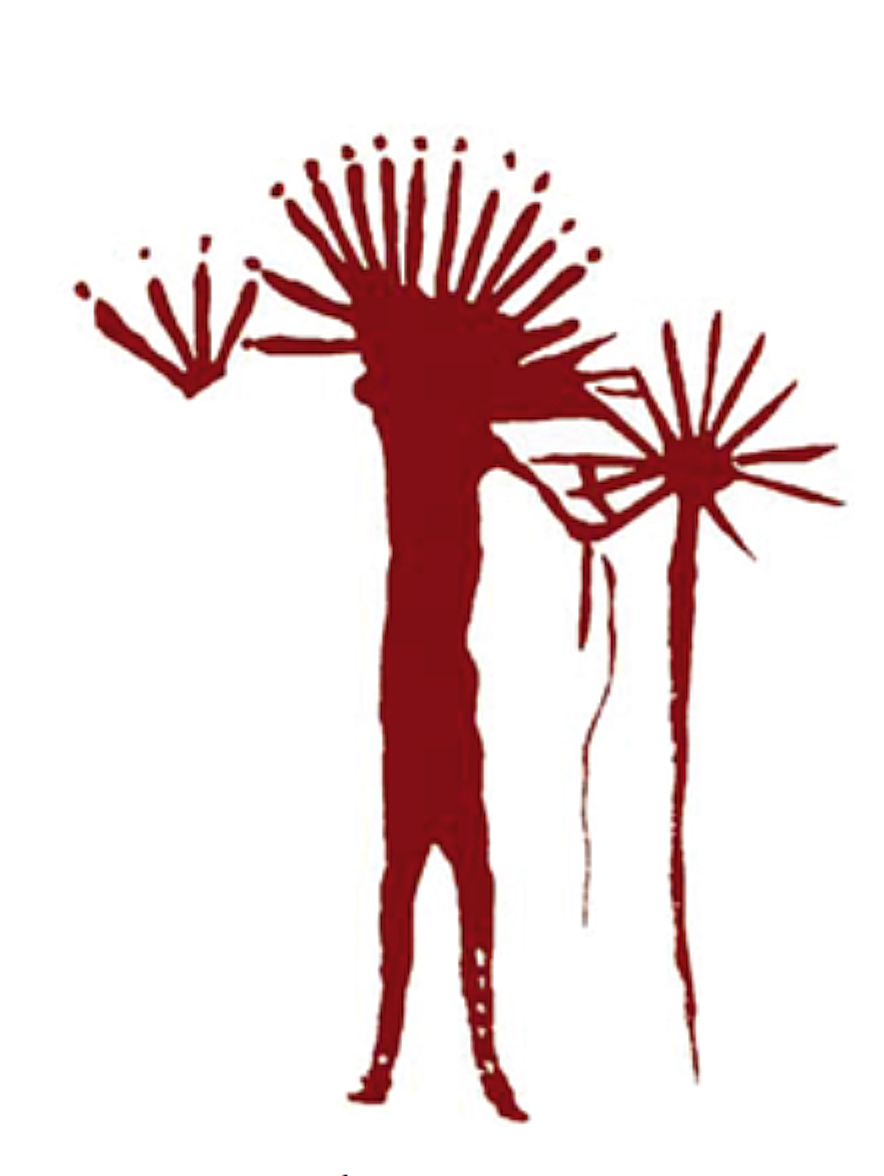
Deity on a funeral slab, Karakol culture

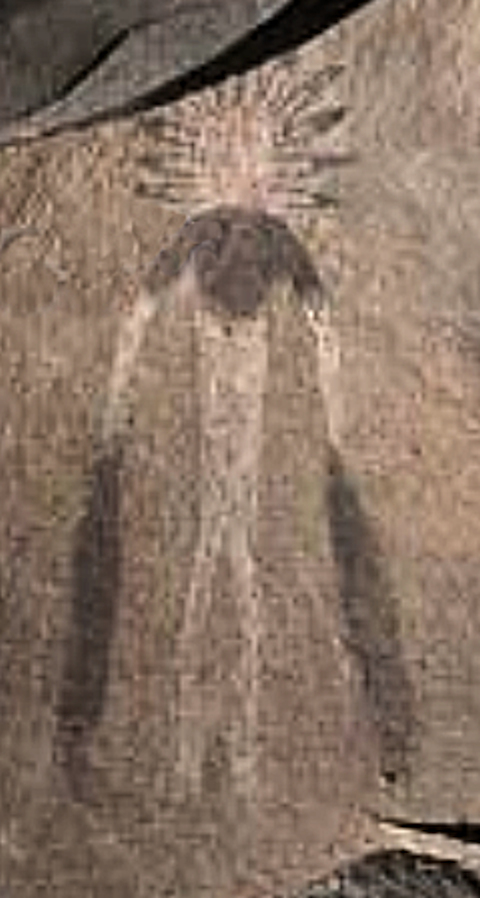
Decoration of funeral slabs, Karakol culture

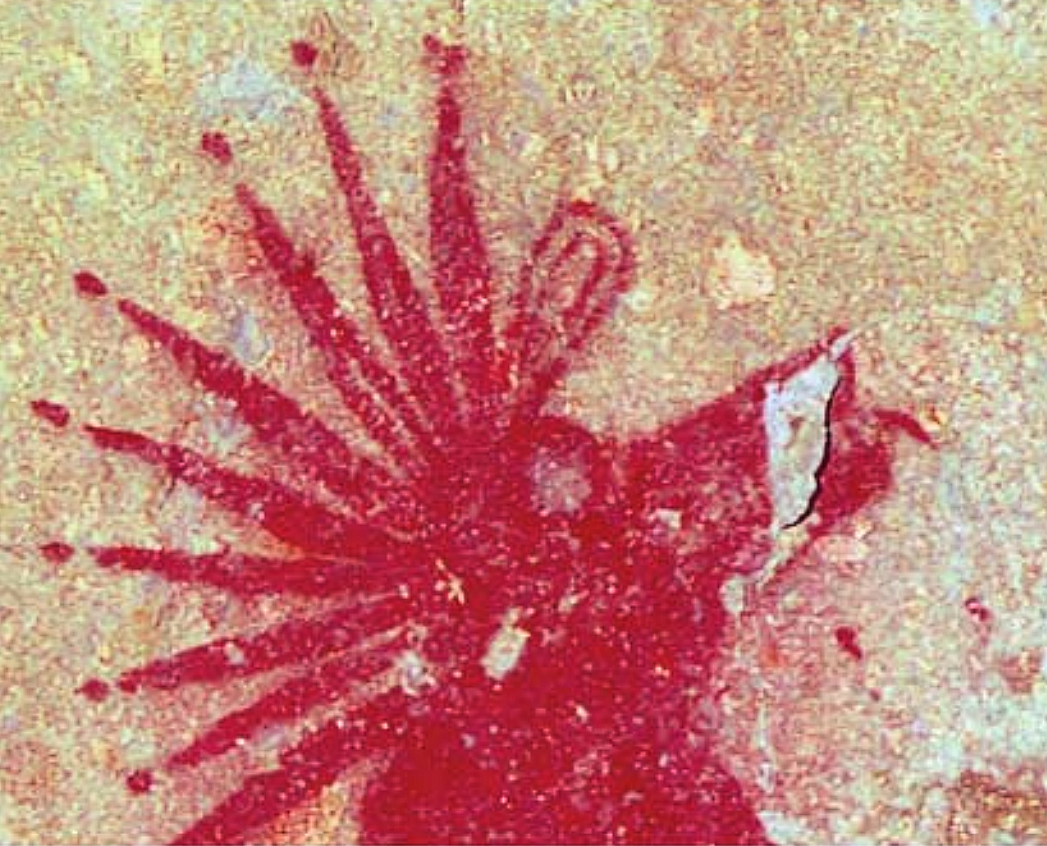
Decoration of funeral slabs, Karakol culture

== Genetic composition ==
Results of correlation between traditional anthropological group-differentiating complex of craniometrical and odontological traits with the markers of mitochondrial DNA were presented in the Professorial dissertation of T.A. Chikisheva, 2010.

The burials of 2 Karakol males dated to between the 2nd and 4th millennium BC were found to have mtDNA Haplogroup U5 (mtDNA), the most common mtDNA haplogroup of Western Hunter Gatherers (WHG), and the other Haplogroup H (mtDNA). The features of the craniums were "intermediate Caucasoid-Mongoloid", similar to other individuals excavated in Ozernoye and Karakol in Central Altai. It is also quite similar to individuals from the Okunevo culture in the Minusinsk depression.

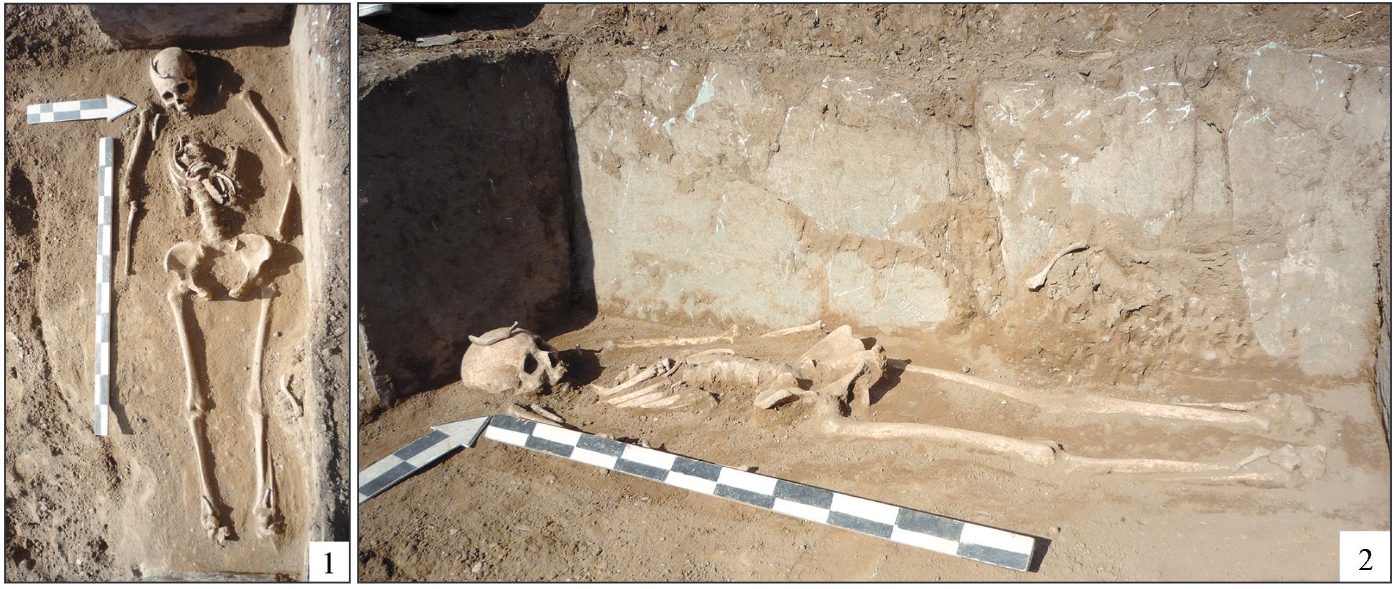
Karakol culture burial, village of Mendur-Sokkon.

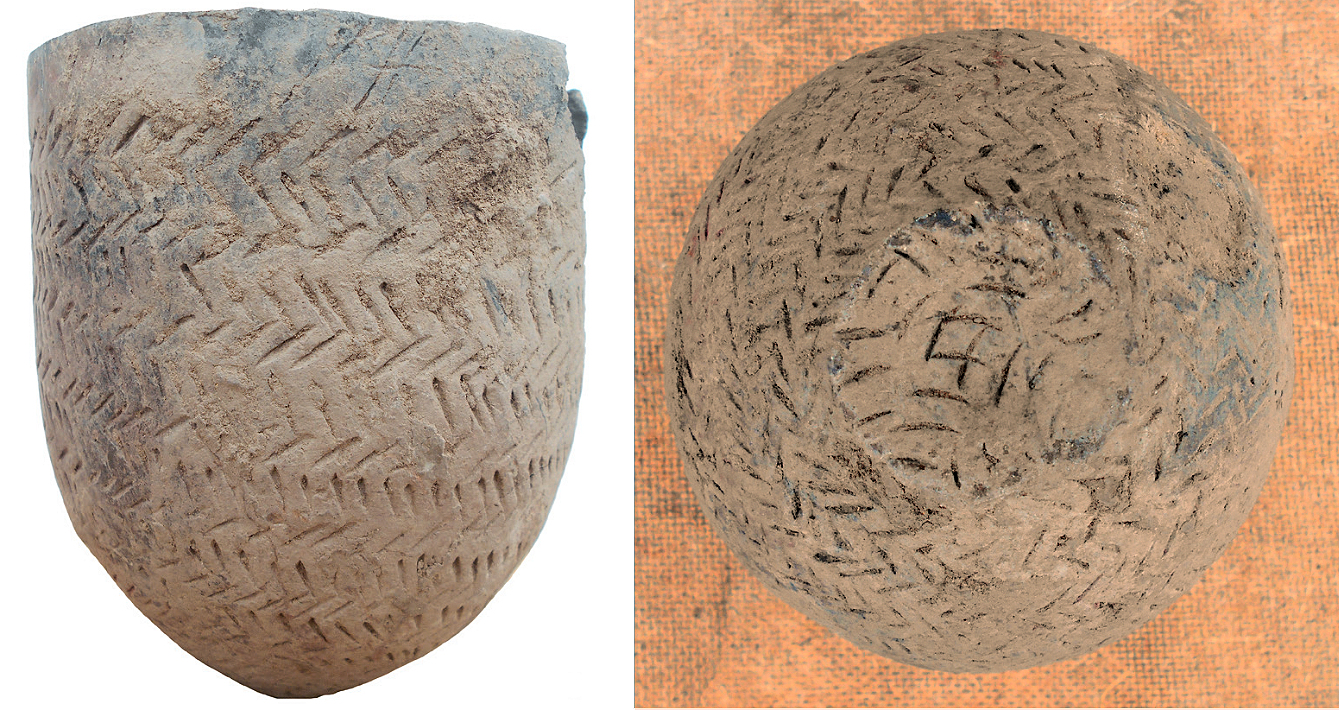
Ceramic vessel from the burial in the village of Mendur-Sokkon (side view, bottom view).

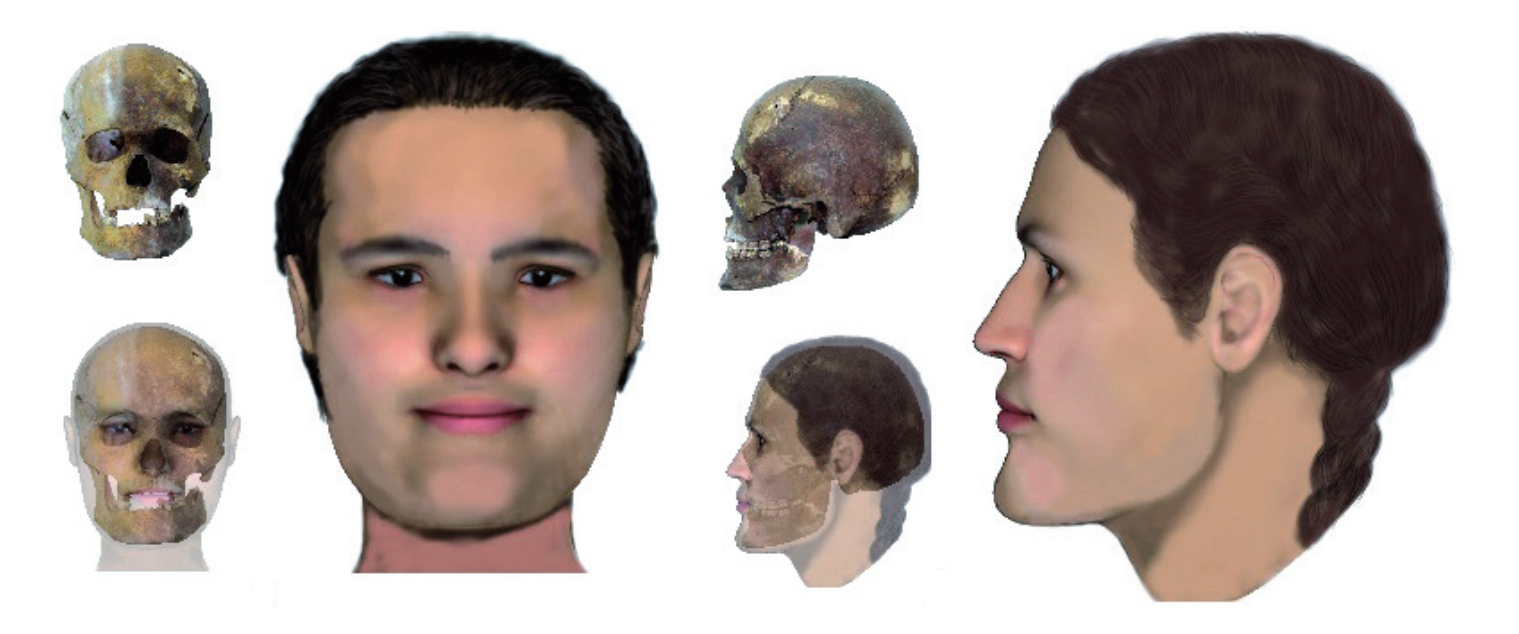
Reconstruction of a Karakol culture female individual (Altai Mountains village of Mendur-Sokkon, circa 2000 BCE).

== Literature ==
- Kubarev V.D. "Ancient paintings of Karakol", Novosibirsk: Science, 1988 (In Russian)
- Molodin V.I. "Karakol Culture"//Materials on Okunev 2 culture and its surroundings, St. Petersburg: Elexis Print, 2006 (In Russian)
- Molodin V.I., Romashchenko A.G., Voivod M.I., Sitnikov V.V., Chikisheva T. "Paleogenetic analysis of the Siberia population gene pool"//Integral Program for Basic Research, Novosibirsk: Siberian Branch of RAS, 1998
- Chikisheva T.A., "Dynamics of anthropological differentiation in population of southern Western Siberia in Neolithic – Early Iron Age", Professorial dissertation, Novosibirsk, 2010, section Conclusions (In Russian)
