= Prehistoric Mongolia =

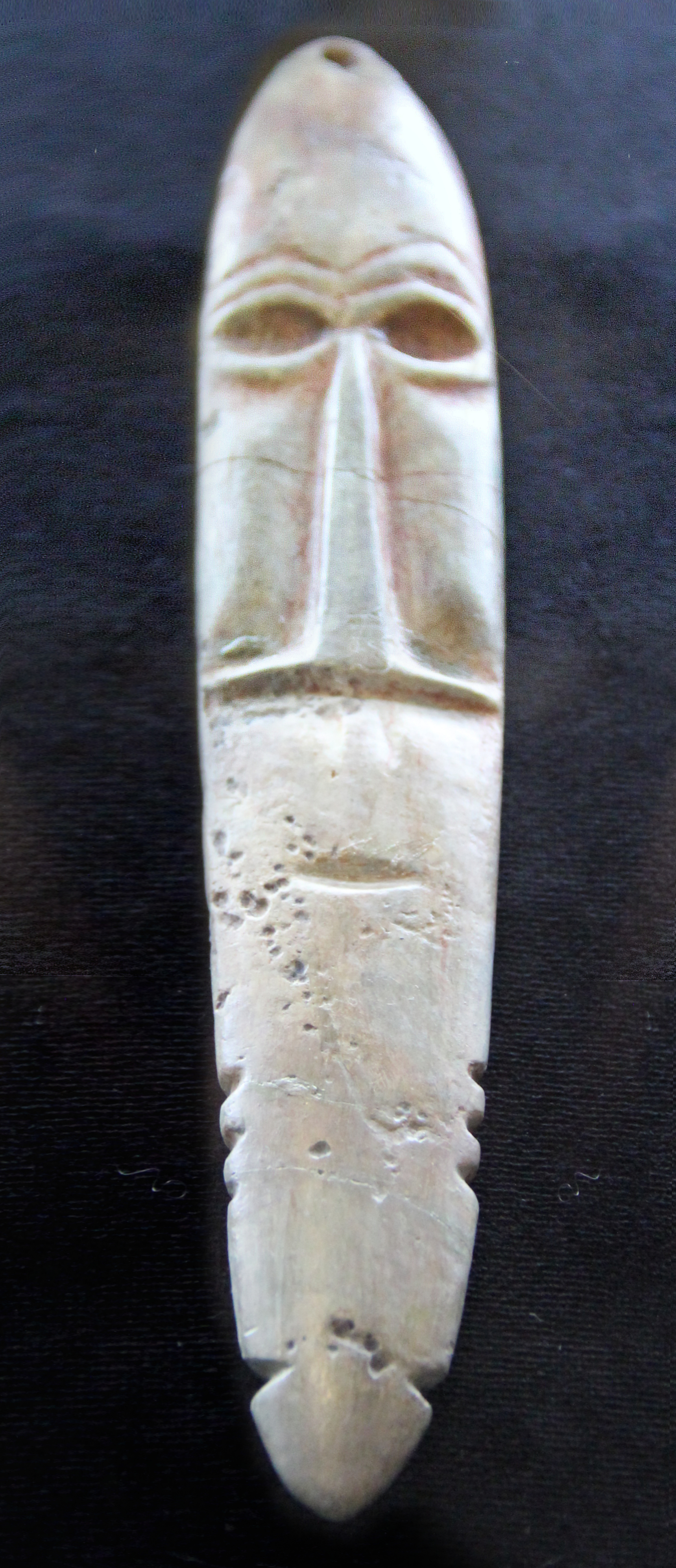
Neolithic stone amulet, Dornod, Mongolia, 4000-3000 BCE

The climate of Central Asia became dry after the large tectonic collision between the Indian Plate and the Eurasian Plate. This impact threw up the massive chain of mountains known as the Himalayas. The Himalayas, Greater Khingan and Lesser Khingan mountains act like a high wall, blocking the warm and wet climate from penetrating into Central Asia. Many of the mountains of Mongolia were formed during the Late Neogene and Early Quaternary periods. The Mongolian climate was more humid hundreds of thousands of years ago.

== Pre-human history ==
The first scientifically confirmed dinosaur eggs were found in Mongolia during the 1923 expedition of the American Museum of Natural History, led by Roy Chapman Andrews.

During the middle to late Eocene Epoch, Mongolia was the home of many Paleogene mammals with Sarkastodon and Andrewsarchus being the most prominent of them.

== Bronze and Early Iron Age ==
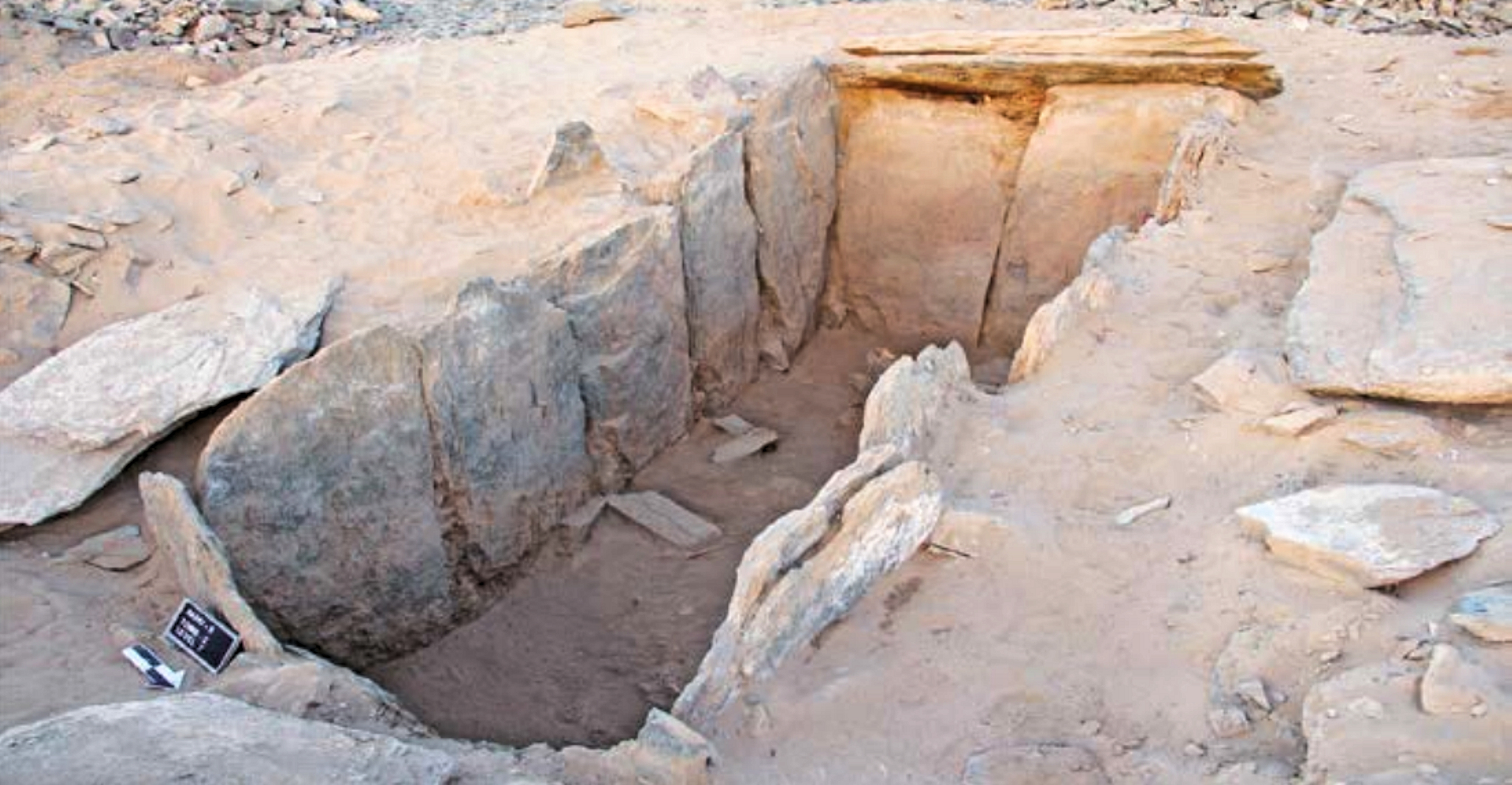
Stone fence and burial of Khemtseg culture, Avyn Khukh Uul, Bulgan, Khovd, Mongolia

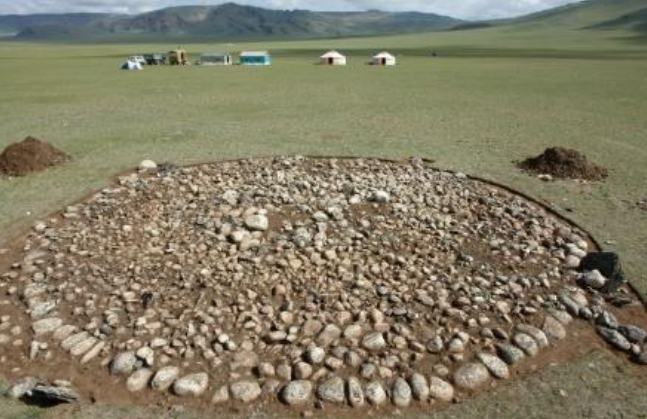
Sagsai-shaped graves, Tsagaan Asga site

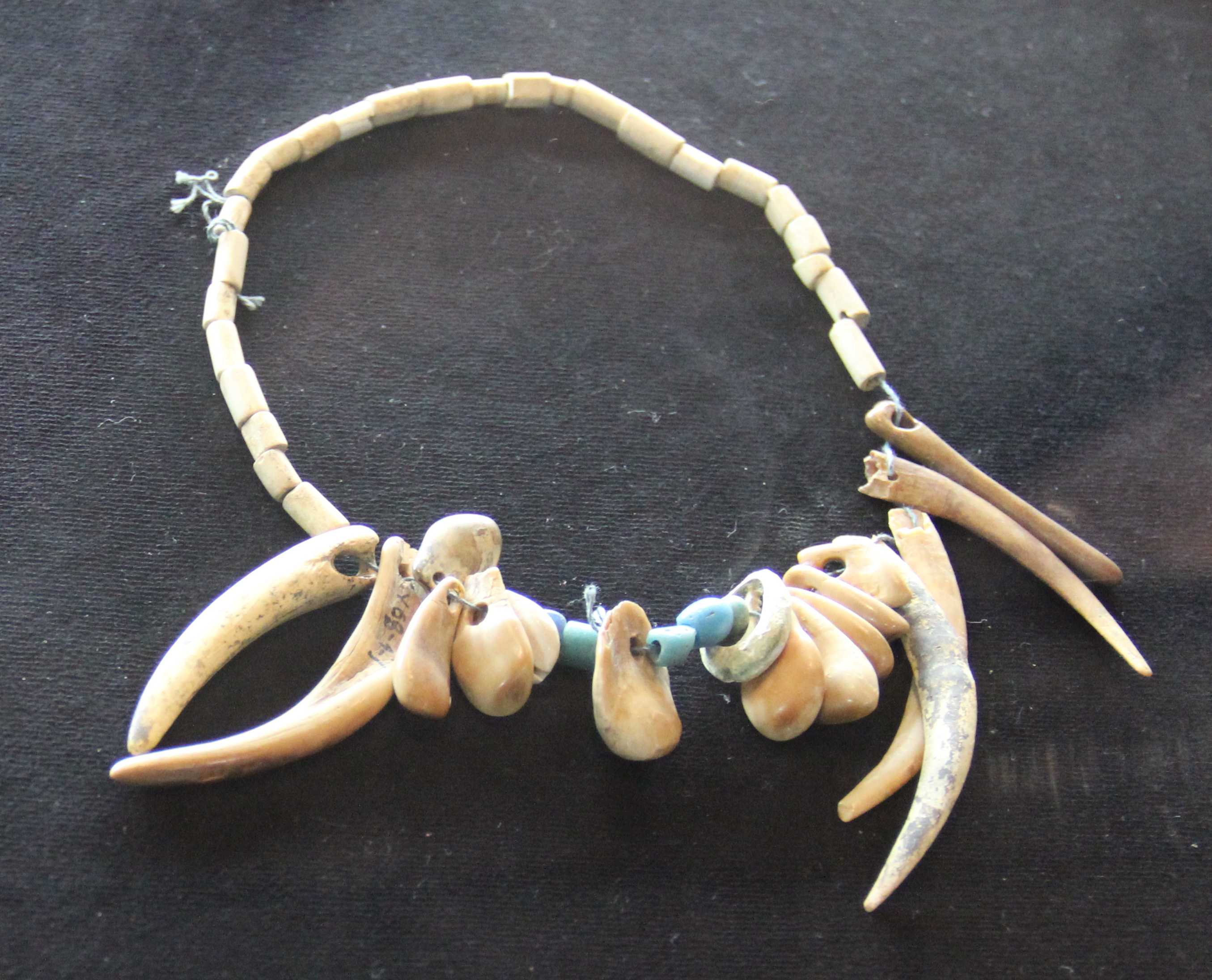
Neolithic necklace, Dornod, Mongolia, 4000–3000 BCE

Deer stones (also known as reindeer stones) are ancient megaliths carved with symbols that can be found all over central and eastern Eurasia but are concentrated largely in Siberia and Mongolia. Most deer stones occur in association with ancient graves; it is believed that stones are the guardians of the dead. Out of 900 of these deer stones found in Central Asia and Siberia, around 700 are located in Mongolia. Their true purpose and creators are still unknown. Some researchers claim that deer stones are rooted in shamanism and are thought to have been set up during the Bronze Age around 1000 BC, and may mark the graves of important people. Later inhabitants of the area likely reused them to mark their own burial mounds, and perhaps for other purposes. In Mongolia, the Lake Baikal area, and the Sayan Altai and Altai Mountain regions, there are 550, 20, 20, and 60 known deer stones respectively. Moreover, there are another 20 deer stones in Kazakhstan and the Middle East (Samashyev 1992) and 10 further west, specifically in Ukraine and parts of the Russian Federation, including the provinces of Orenburg and the Caucasus, and near the Elbe River (Mongolian History 2003).

There are different viewpoints about the origins of deer stone art. According to H. L. Chlyenova, the artistic deer image originated from the Saka tribe and its branches (Chlyenova 1962). Volkov believes that some of the methods of crafting deer stone art are closely related to Scythians (Volkov 1967), whereas D. Tseveendorj regards deer stone art as having originated in Mongolia during the Bronze Age and spread thereafter to Tuva and the Baikal area (Tseveendorj 1979). D. G. Savinov (1994) and M. H. Mannai-Ool (1970) have also studied deer stone art and have reached other conclusions.

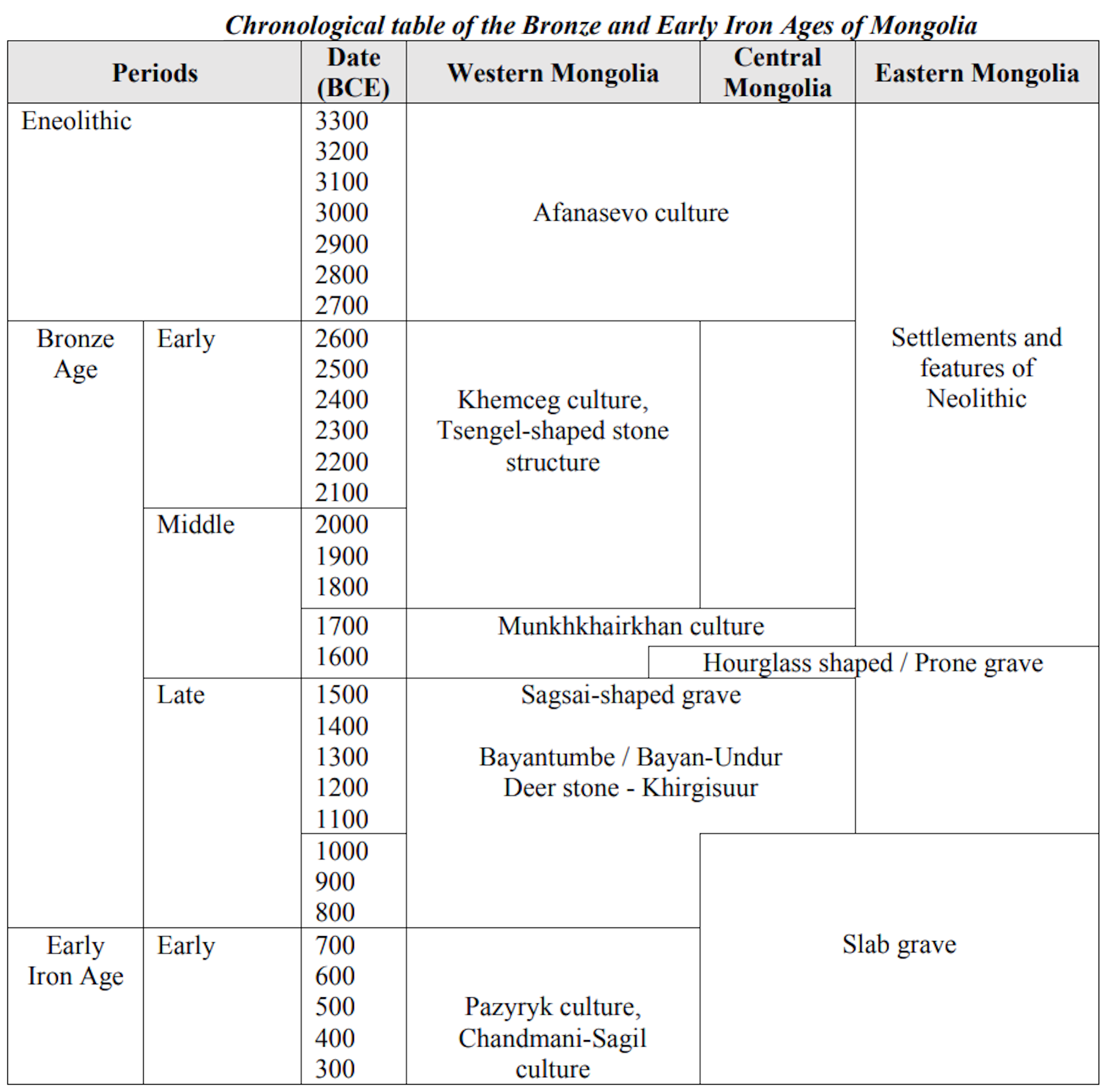
Chronological table of the Bronze and Early Iron Ages of Mongolia.

== See also ==
- Proto-Mongols
- Mongolian plateau
- History of Asia
- History of Central Asia
- Animal Style
- Urheimat
- Cretaceous Mongolia
- Afanasevo culture
