= Domestication of the horse =

The exact timeline and mechanisms of the domestication of the horse have been subject to significant academic debate. Although horses appeared in Paleolithic cave art as early as 30,000 BCE, these were wild horses and were probably hunted for meat. Early discoveries in the context of the Botai culture in the Akmola Province of Kazakhstan had strongly suggested that Botai settlements (dated to 3700–3500 BCE) were the location of the earliest domestication, citing evidence such as bit-related tooth wear and horse milking.

However, more recent archaeological and genetic evaluations have challenged this timeline. Taylor and Barrón-Ortiz (2021) argue that Botai findings reflect only intensive exploitation of wild horses, possibly involving some level of management, herding, or seasonal capture, but not full domestication in the way we see in later horse-using societies. While earlier studies by Warmuth et al. (2012) pointed to horses having been domesticated around 3000 BCE in what is now Ukraine, Russia, and Western Kazakhstan, archaeozoologist William T. Taylor argues that true domestication did not take place until around 2000 BCE.

Though previously thought to have been domesticated in Central Asia, recent genetic studies have shown that all modern domestic horses were exclusively domesticated in the Pontic–Caspian steppe of Eastern Europe. Genomic evidence indicates that the source of this domestication occurred around 2200 BCE in the Volga–Don region of modern-day southwestern Russia, rather than earlier, broader suggestions. From this core area, the domestic lineage rapidly expanded across Eurasia for transportation, agricultural work, and warfare, completely replacing other local horse populations. Scientists have linked the successful spread of domesticated horses to observed genetic mutations. They speculate that stronger backs (the GSDMC gene) and increased docility (the ZFPM1 gene) made these horses uniquely suitable for riding, providing the clearest evidence for their widespread use as a means of transport in chariot burials dated c. 2000 BCE.

== Background ==
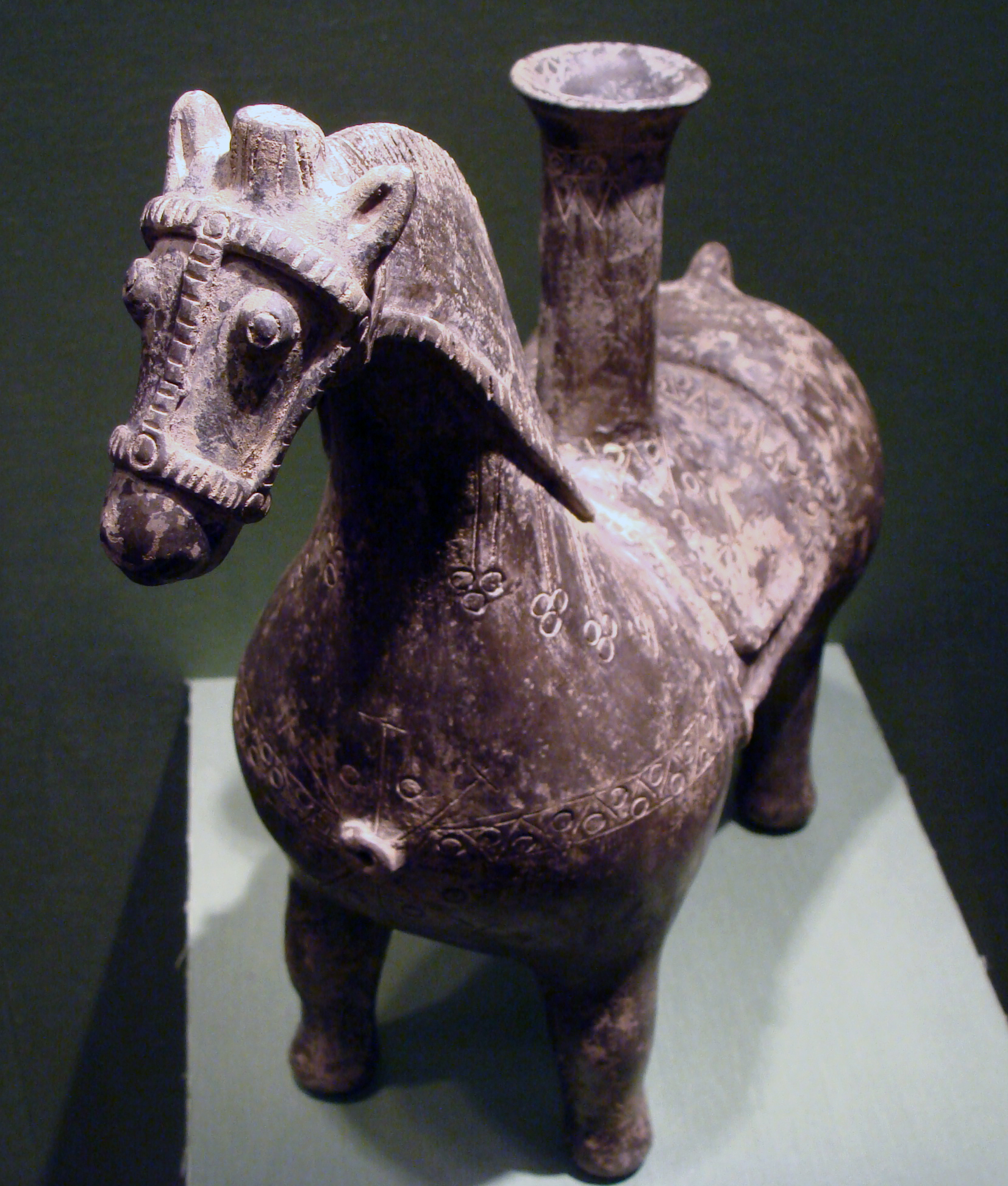
Terracotta urn in the shape of a horse (Iran, 1000 BCE) at the Lyndon B. Johnson Presidential Library

The date of the domestication of the horse depends to some degree upon the definition of "domestication". Some zoologists define "domestication" as human control over breeding, which can be detected in ancient skeletal samples by changes in the size and variability of ancient horse populations. Other researchers look at the broader evidence, including skeletal and dental evidence of working activity; weapons, art, and spiritual artifacts; and lifestyle patterns of human cultures. There is evidence that horses were kept as a source of meat and milk before they were trained as working animals.

Attempts to date domestication by genetic study or analysis of physical remains rest on the assumption that there was a separation of the genotypes of domesticated and wild populations. Such a separation appears to have taken place, but dates based on such methods can only produce an estimate of the latest possible date for domestication without excluding the possibility of an unknown period of earlier gene flow between wild and domestic populations (which will occur naturally as long as the domesticated population is kept within the habitat of the wild population).

Whether one adopts the narrower zoological definition of domestication or the broader cultural definition that rests on an array of zoological and archaeological evidence affects the time frame chosen for the domestication of the horse. The date of 4300-4000 BCE is based on evidence that includes the appearance of dental pathologies associated with bitting, changes in butchering practices, changes in human economies and settlement patterns, the depiction of horses as symbols of power in artifacts, patterns consistent with long-distance raiding and the appearance of horse bones in human graves. On the other hand, measurable changes in size and increases in variability associated with domestication occurred later, about 2500–2000 BCE, as seen in horse remains found at the site of Csepel-Haros in Hungary, a settlement of the Bell Beaker culture.

Use of horses spread across Eurasia for transportation, agricultural work and warfare. Horses and mules in agriculture used a breastplate type harness or a yoke more suitable for oxen, which was not as efficient at utilizing the full strength of the animals as the later-invented padded horse collar that arose several millennia later.

== Predecessors to the domestic horse ==
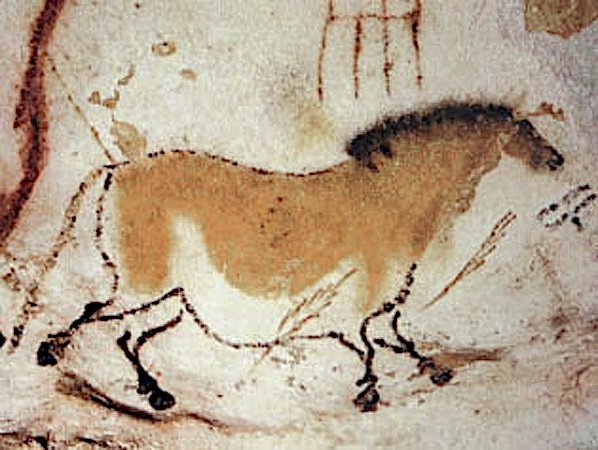
A horse painting from a cave in Lascaux

A 2005 study analyzed the mitochondrial DNA (mtDNA) of a worldwide range of equids, from 53,000-year-old fossils to contemporary horses. Their analysis placed all equids into a single clade, or group with a single common ancestor, consisting of three genetically divergent species: the South American Hippidion, the North American New World stilt-legged horse, and Equus, the true horse. The true horse included prehistoric horses and the Przewalski's horse, as well as what is now the many breeds of modern domestic horses, belonged to a single Holarctic species.

The true horse migrated from the Americas to Eurasia via Beringia, becoming broadly distributed from North America to central Europe, north and south of Pleistocene ice sheets. It became extinct in Beringia around 14,200 years ago, and in the rest of the Americas around 10,000 years ago. This clade survived in Eurasia, however, and it is from these horses which all domestic horses appear to have descended. These horses showed little phylogeographic structure, probably reflecting their high degree of mobility and adaptability.

Therefore, the domestic horse today is classified as Equus ferus caballus. No genetic originals of native wild horses currently exist. The Przewalski diverged from the modern horse before domestication. It has 66 chromosomes, as opposed to 64 among modern domesticated horses, and their Mitochondrial DNA (mtDNA) forms a distinct cluster. Genetic evidence suggests that modern Przewalski's horses are descended from a distinct regional gene pool in the eastern part of the Eurasian steppes, not from the same genetic group that gave rise to modern domesticated horses. Nevertheless, evidence such as the cave paintings of Lascaux suggests that the ancient wild horses that some researchers now label the "Tarpan subtype" probably resembled Przewalski horses in their general appearance: big heads, dun coloration, thick necks, stiff upright manes, and relatively short, stout legs.

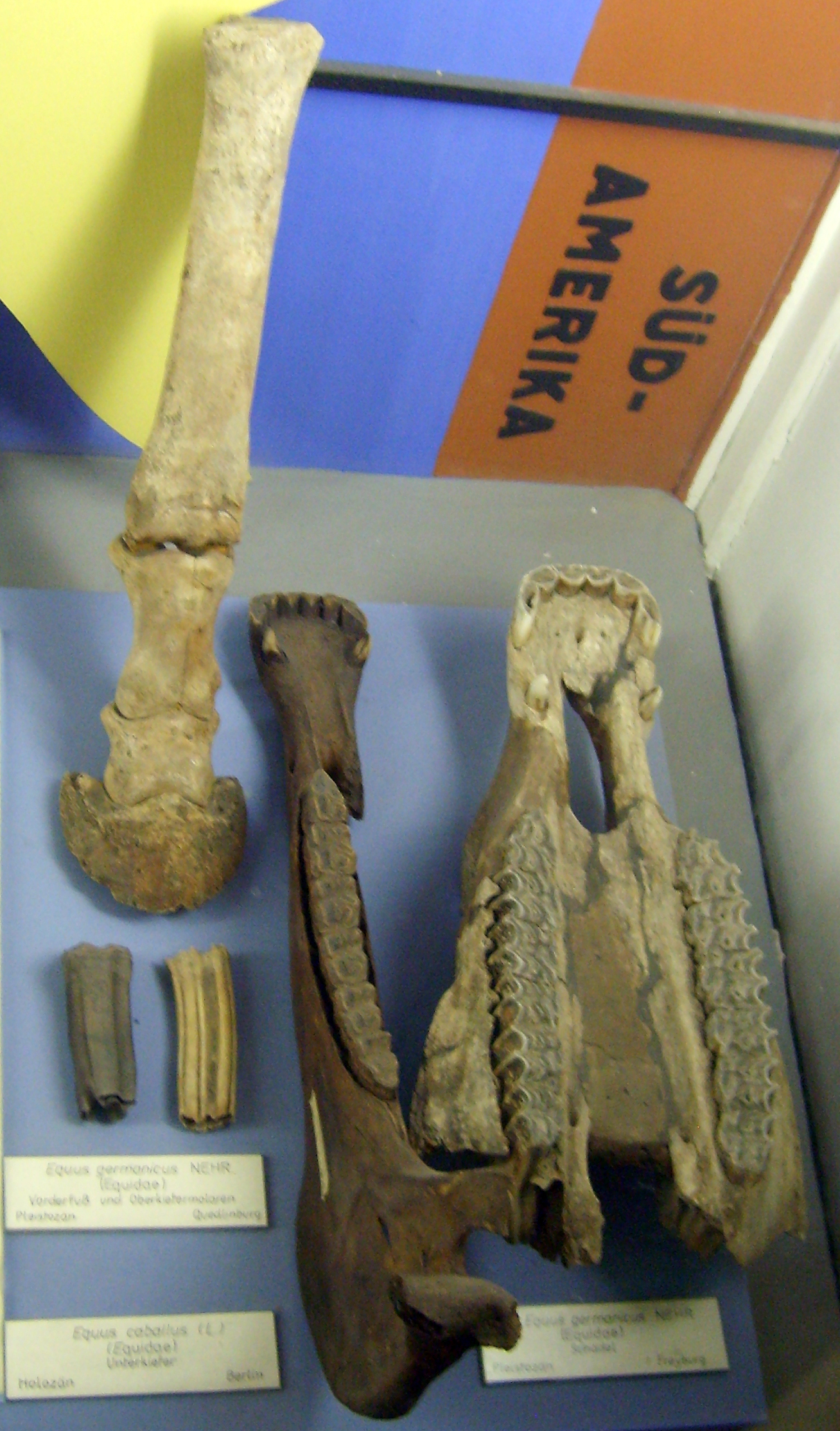
Equus caballus germanicus front leg, teeth and upper jaw at the Museum für Naturkunde, Berlin

The horses of the Ice Age were hunted for meat in Europe and across the Eurasian steppes and in North America by early modern humans. Numerous kill sites exist and many cave paintings in Europe indicate what they looked like. Many of these Ice Age subspecies died out during the rapid climate changes associated with the end of the last Ice Age particularly in North America, where the horse became completely extinct.

Two undomesticated sub-species survived into historic times: Przewalski's horse (Equus ferus przewalski) and the Tarpan (Equus ferus ferus). The Tarpan became extinct in the late 19th century and Przewalski's horse is endangered; it became extinct in the wild during the late 1960s, but was re-introduced in the early 1990s to two preserves in Mongolia. Although researchers such as Marija Gimbutas theorized that the horses of the Chalcolithic (Copper Age) were Przewalski's, more recent genetic studies indicate that Przewalski's horse is not an ancestor to modern domesticated horses.

== Genetic evidence ==
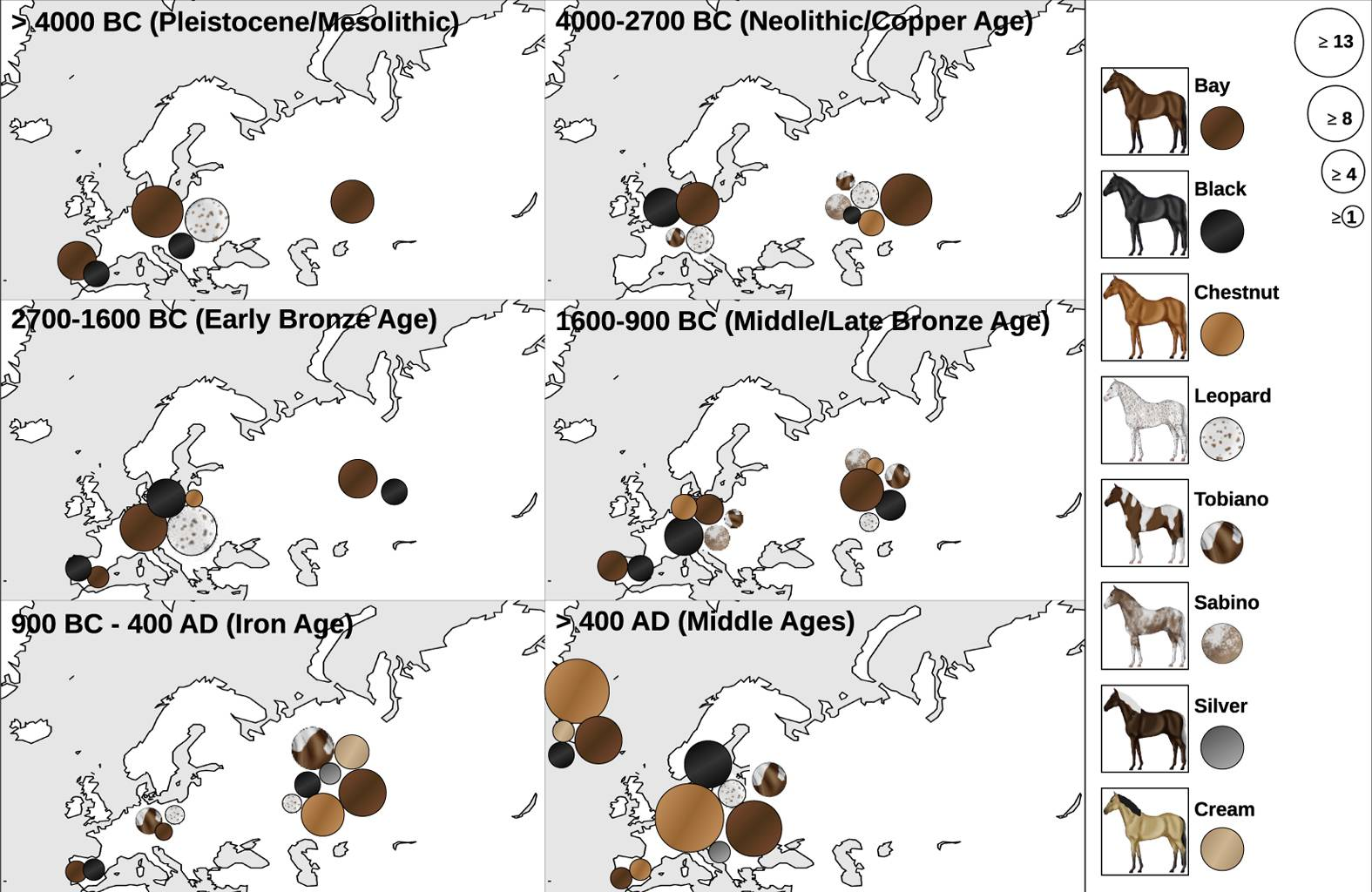
The early stages of domestication were marked by a rapid increase in coat colour variation.

A 2014 study compared DNA from ancient horse bones that predated domestication and compared them to DNA of modern horses, discovering 125 genes that correlated to domestication. Some were physical, affecting muscle and limb development, cardiac strength and balance. Others were linked to cognitive function and most likely were critical to the taming of the horse, including social behavior, learning capabilities, fear response, and agreeableness. The DNA used in this study came from horse bones 16,000 to 43,000 years ago, and therefore the precise changes that occurred at the time of domestication have yet to be sequenced.

The domestication of stallions and mares can be analyzed separately by looking at those portions of the DNA that are passed on exclusively along the maternal (mitochondrial DNA or mtDNA) or paternal line (Y-chromosome or Y-DNA). DNA studies indicate that there may have been multiple domestication events for mares, as the number of female lines required to account for the genetic diversity of the modern horse suggests a minimum of 77 different ancestral mares, divided into 17 distinct lineages. Studies of modern horses showed very little Y chromosome diversity, which was originally interpreted as evidence of a single domestication event for a limited number of stallions combined with repeated restocking of wild females into the domesticated herds. However, more recent studies of ancient DNA show that Y chromosome diversity was significantly higher a thousand years ago. The low present diversity may be partially explained by the popularity of Arabian and Turkoman studs, especially the three foundation stallions of the Thoroughbred breed.

A study published in 2012 that performed genomic sampling on 300 work horses from local areas as well as a review of previous studies of archaeology, mitochondrial DNA, and Y-DNA suggested that horses were originally domesticated in the western part of the Eurasian steppe. Both domesticated stallions and mares spread out from this area, and then additional wild mares were added from local herds; wild mares were easier to handle than wild stallions. Most other parts of the world were ruled out as sites for horse domestication, either due to climate unsuitable for an indigenous wild horse population or no evidence of domestication.

Genes located on the Y-chromosome are inherited only from sire to its male offspring and these lines show a very reduced degree of genetic variation (aka genetic homogeneity) in modern domestic horses, far less than expected based on the overall genetic variation in the remaining genetic material. This indicates that a relatively few stallions were domesticated and that it is unlikely that many male offspring originating from unions between wild stallions and domestic mares were included in early domesticated breeding stock.

Genes located in the mitochondrial DNA are passed on along the maternal line from the mother to her offspring. Multiple analyses of the mitochondrial DNA obtained from modern horses as well as from horse bones and teeth from archaeological and palaeological finds consistently shows an increased genetic diversity in the mitochondrial DNA compared to the remaining DNA, showing that a large number of mares has been included into the breeding stock of the originally domesticated horse.

Variation in the mitochondrial DNA is used to determine so-called haplogroups. A haplogroup is a group of closely related haplotypes that share the same common ancestor. In horses, eighteen main haplogroups are recognized (A-R). Several haplogroups are unequally distributed around the world, indicating the addition of local wild mares to the domesticated stock.

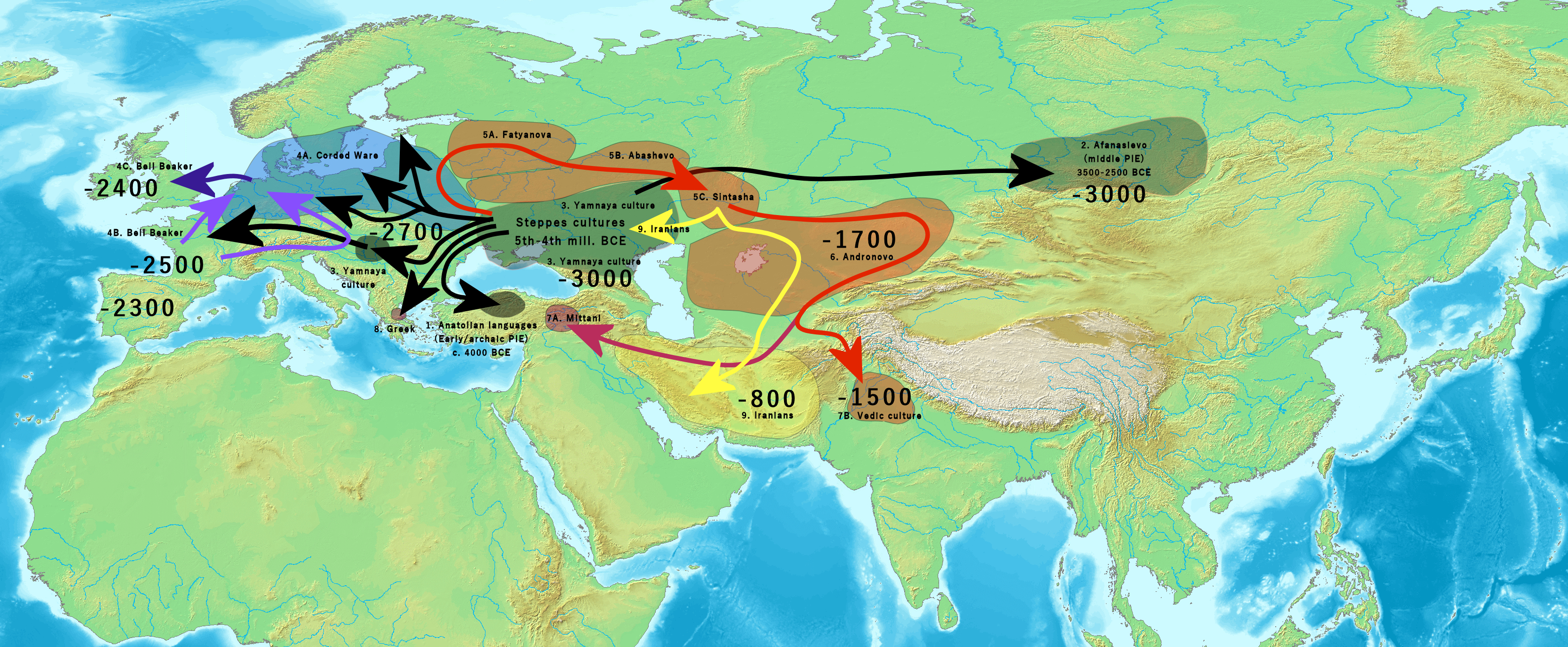
The dispersal of the DOM2 genetic lineage, believed to be the ancestor of all modern domesticated horses, is linked with the populations which preceded the Sintashta culture and their expansions.

In 2018, genomic comparison of 42 ancient-horse genomes, 20 of which were from Botai, with 46 published ancient and modern-horse genomes yielded surprising results. It was found that modern domestic horses are not closely related to the horses at Botai. Rather, Przewalski's horses were identified as feral descendants of horses herded at Botai. Evidence suggested that "a massive genomic turnover" had occurred along with the domestication of horses and large-scale human population expansion in the Early Bronze Age. Subsequent research showed that horse lineages from Iberia and Siberia, also associated with early domestication, had little influence on the genetics of modern domestic horses.

More than 150 scientists collaborated in gathering 264 ancient horse genomes from across Eurasia, dating from 50,000 to 200 B.C.E. In October 2021, results of the analysis were published in Nature. They indicated that domestication of the modern horse's ancestors likely occurred in the Volga-Don region of the Pontic–Caspian steppe grasslands of Eastern Europe. Both Tarpan and Przewalski's horse were related to different ancestral populations than those underlying the modern domestic horses (DOM2).

In addition, researchers were able to map population changes over time as modern domestic horses expanded rapidly across Eurasia and displaced other local populations, from about 2000 BCE onwards. The genetic profile for DOM2 horses is associated with horses buried in Sintashta kurgans with early spoke-wheeled chariots, and with horses in Central Anatolia where two-wheeled vehicles were depicted. DOM2 horses also occur in some areas prior to the earliest evidence for chariots, suggesting that both horseback riding and chariot use were factors in expansion.

Genetic data may also provide clues as to why this particular domestication event had far more widespread impact than other domestication events in Botai, Iberia, SIberia and Anatolia. The genetic lineage that leads to modern domestic horses shows evidence of strong selection for locomotor and behavioural adaptations. Changes relate to the GSDMC gene and the ZFPM1 gene. The GSDMC gene is linked to back problems in people, and scientists speculate that changes may have made horses' backs stronger. The ZFPM1 gene is related to mood regulation, and scientists speculate that this may have made horses more docile and easier to tame and manage. Strength and docility would have made horses more suitable for riding and other uses.

== Archaeological evidence ==
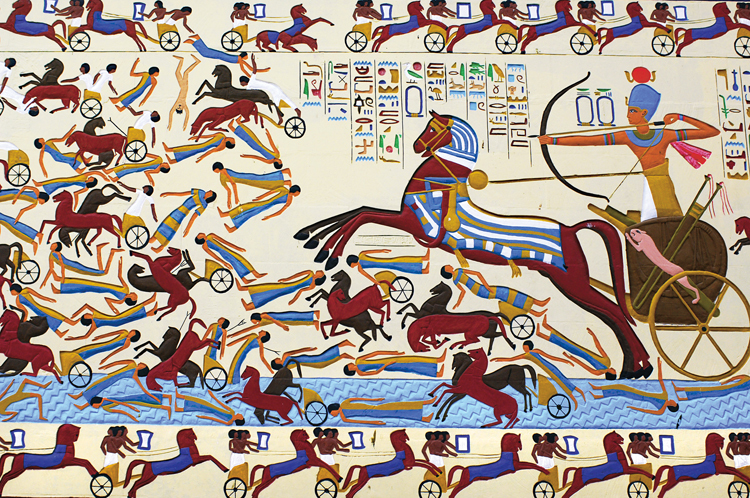
Chariots of Ramesses II and the Hittites in the Battle of Kadesh, 1274 BCE. Modern interpretation of a relief on the walls of the Ramesseum

Archaeological evidence for the domestication of the horse comes from three kinds of sources: 1) changes in the skeletons and teeth of ancient horses; 2) changes in the geographic distribution of ancient horses, particularly the introduction of horses into regions where no wild horses had existed; and 3) archaeological sites containing artifacts, images, or evidence of changes in human behavior connected with horses.

Examples include horse remains interred in human graves; changes in the ages and sexes of the horses killed by humans; the appearance of horse corrals; equipment such as bits or other types of horse tack; horses interred with equipment intended for use by horses, such as chariots; and depictions of horses used for equestrianism, driving, draught work, or symbols of human power.

Few of these categories, taken alone, provide irrefutable evidence of domestication, but the cumulative evidence becomes increasingly more persuasive.

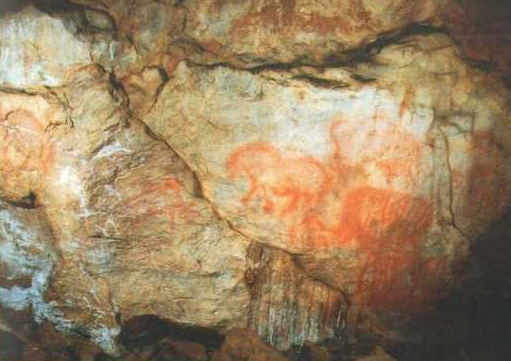
Drawing of a horse, a mammoth, and a rhinoceros in the Shulgan-Tash Cave, 25-10 thousand years B.C.

=== Horses interred with chariots ===
The least ancient, but most persuasive, evidence of domestication comes from sites where horse leg bones and skulls, probably originally attached to hides, were interred with the remains of chariots in at least 16 graves of the Sintashta and Petrovka cultures. These were located in the steppes southeast of the Ural Mountains, between the upper Ural and upper Tobol Rivers, a region today divided between southern Russia and northern Kazakhstan. Petrovka was a little later than and probably grew out of Sintashta, and the two complexes together spanned about 2100–1700 BCE. A few of these graves contained the remains of as many as eight sacrificed horses placed in, above, and beside the grave.

In all of the dated chariot graves, the heads and hooves of a pair of horses were placed in a grave that once contained a chariot. Evidence of chariots in these graves was inferred from the impressions of two spoked wheels set in grave floors 1.2–1.6m apart; in most cases the rest of the vehicle left no trace. In addition, a pair of disk-shaped antler "cheekpieces," an ancient predecessor to a modern bit shank or bit ring, were placed in pairs beside each horse head-and-hoof sacrifice. The inner faces of the disks had protruding prongs or studs that would have pressed against the horse's lips when the reins were pulled on the opposite side. Studded cheekpieces were a new and fairly severe kind of control device that appeared simultaneously with chariots.

All of the dated chariot graves contained wheel impressions, horse bones, weapons (arrow and javelin points, axes, daggers, or stone mace-heads), human skeletal remains, and cheekpieces. Because they were buried in teams of two with chariots and studded cheekpieces, the evidence is extremely persuasive that these steppe horses of 2100–1700 BCE were domesticated. Shortly after the period of these burials, the expansion of the domestic horse throughout Europe was little short of explosive. In the space of possibly 500 years, there is evidence of horse-drawn chariots in Greece, Egypt, and Mesopotamia. By another 500 years, the horse-drawn chariot had spread to China.

=== Skeletal indicators of domestication ===
Some researchers do not consider an animal to be "domesticated" until it exhibits physical changes consistent with selective breeding, or at least having been born and raised entirely in captivity. Until that point, they classify captive animals as merely "tamed". Those who hold to this theory of domestication point to a change in skeletal measurements detected among horse bones recovered from middens dated about 2500 BCE in eastern Hungary in Bell-Beaker sites, and in later Bronze Age sites in the Russian steppes, Spain, and Eastern Europe. Horse bones from these contexts exhibited an increase in variability, thought to reflect the survival under human care of both larger and smaller individuals than appeared in the wild; and a decrease in average size, thought to reflect penning and restriction in diet. Horse populations that showed this combination of skeletal changes probably were domesticated. Most evidence suggests that horses were increasingly controlled by humans after about 2500 BCE. However, more recently there have been skeletal remains found at a site in Kazakhstan which display the smaller, more slender limbs characteristic of corralled animals, dated to 3500 BCE. The horse bones from Urdoviza, located on the Bulgarian Black Sea coast, are a significant archaeological find, suggesting early horse domestication from the end of the 4th to the early 3rd millennium BC (circa 3100 BC). These remains, numbering around 450, show early signs of domestication, with some bones bearing butchering or thermal treatment marks. Key details about the Urdoviza horse bones: Age: Radiocarbon dating places the bones at the end of the fourth/beginning of the third millennium BC (3340–2740 BC). Significance: These are considered among the earliest domesticated horse remains in Europe and the oldest to the west of the North Pontic area. Characteristics: The bones belonged to relatively small domesticated horses, with a withers height of about 129 cm to 137 cm (small to medium size). Context: They were found in a submerged Early Bronze Age settlement. Findings: The remains included a large number of bones from both young and old individuals, with a high number of male animals among the skull fragments. Location: The findings come from the sunken prehistoric village of Urdoviza, located in modern-day Kiten, Bulgaria. Study: Research on the bones suggests they represent a domestic, rather than wild, population, based on metric analysis, including comparison to the Botai horses.

=== Horse dairying ===
Recent findings indicate that the diet of the Early Bronze Age (c. 3rd millennium BC) Yamnaya groups centered on herd animals, particularly goats, cattle, and sheep, with evidence of regular consumption of milk and other low-lactose processed products, such as cheese, yogurt, or fermented milk drinks. Protein analysis of Early Bronze Age Yamnaya sites in the Pontic–Caspian steppe, have also revealed evidence of mare milk consumption, indicating the domestication of horses. This newfound ability to exploit secondary products like milk and the ability to ride horses provided significant nutritional and mobility advantages, facilitating the massive Yamnaya culture's expansion across Eurasia.

In the central Asian steppe, specifically Northern Kazakhstan, the analysis of lipid residues (fatty acids) preserved in pottery from the Botai culture has provided compelling evidence that dairy consumption, specifically mare's milk, was occurring roughly 5,500 years ago (around 3500–3700 BCE).

Research indicates that by roughly 1200 BCE, particularly within the Eastern Eurasian Steppe (modern Mongolia), humans began consuming horse milk, as evidenced by dental plaque analysis. This shift aligns with the rise of mobile pastoralism, the earliest evidence of horse bridling/riding, and the inclusion of horses in ritual burials (khirigsuurs).

=== Botai culture ===
Some of the most intriguing evidence of early domestication comes from the Botai culture, found in northern Kazakhstan. The Botai culture was a culture of foragers who seem to have adopted horseback riding in order to hunt the abundant wild horses of northern Kazakhstan between 3700 and 3500 BCE. Evidence of horseback riding comes from tooth wear caused by a bit Botai sites had no cattle or sheep bones; the only domesticated animals, in addition to horses, were dogs. Botai settlements in this period contained between 50 and 150 pit houses. Garbage deposits contained tens to hundreds of thousands of discarded animal bones, 65% to 99% of which had come from horses. Earlier hunter-gatherers who lived in the same region had not hunted wild horses with such success, and lived for millennia in smaller, more shifting settlements, often containing less than 200 wild animal bones.

Entire herds of horses were slaughtered by the Botai hunters, apparently in hunting drives. The adoption of horseback riding might explain the emergence of specialised horse-hunting techniques and larger, more permanent settlements. Domesticated horses could have been adopted from neighboring herding societies in the steppes west of the Ural Mountains, where the Khvalynsk culture had herds of cattle and sheep, and perhaps had domesticated horses, as early as 4800 BCE.

Other researchers have argued that all of the Botai horses were wild, and that the horse-hunters of Botai hunted wild horses on foot. As evidence, they note that zoologists have found no skeletal changes in the Botai horses that indicate domestication. Moreover, because they were hunted for food, the majority of the horse remains found in Botai-culture settlements indeed probably were wild. On the other hand, any domesticated riding horses were probably the same size as their wild cousins and cannot now be distinguished by bone measurements. They also note that the age structure of the horses slaughtered at Botai represents a natural demographic profile for hunted animals, not the pattern expected if they were domesticated and selected for slaughter. However, these arguments were published before a Copper Age corral was discovered at Krasnyi Yar in 2006 and mats of horse-dung at two other Botai sites. Current findings continue to support the Botai as having domesticated horses.

A study in 2018 revealed that the Botai horses did not contribute significantly to the genetics of modern domesticated horses, and that therefore a subsequent and separate domestication event must have been responsible for the modern domestic horse. Genetic evidence also connects Botai horses with Przewalski's horse in Mongolia, which has led to debates over whether Przewalski's horses should be considered a never-domesticated population or feral descendants of domesticated Botai horses.

=== Bit wear ===
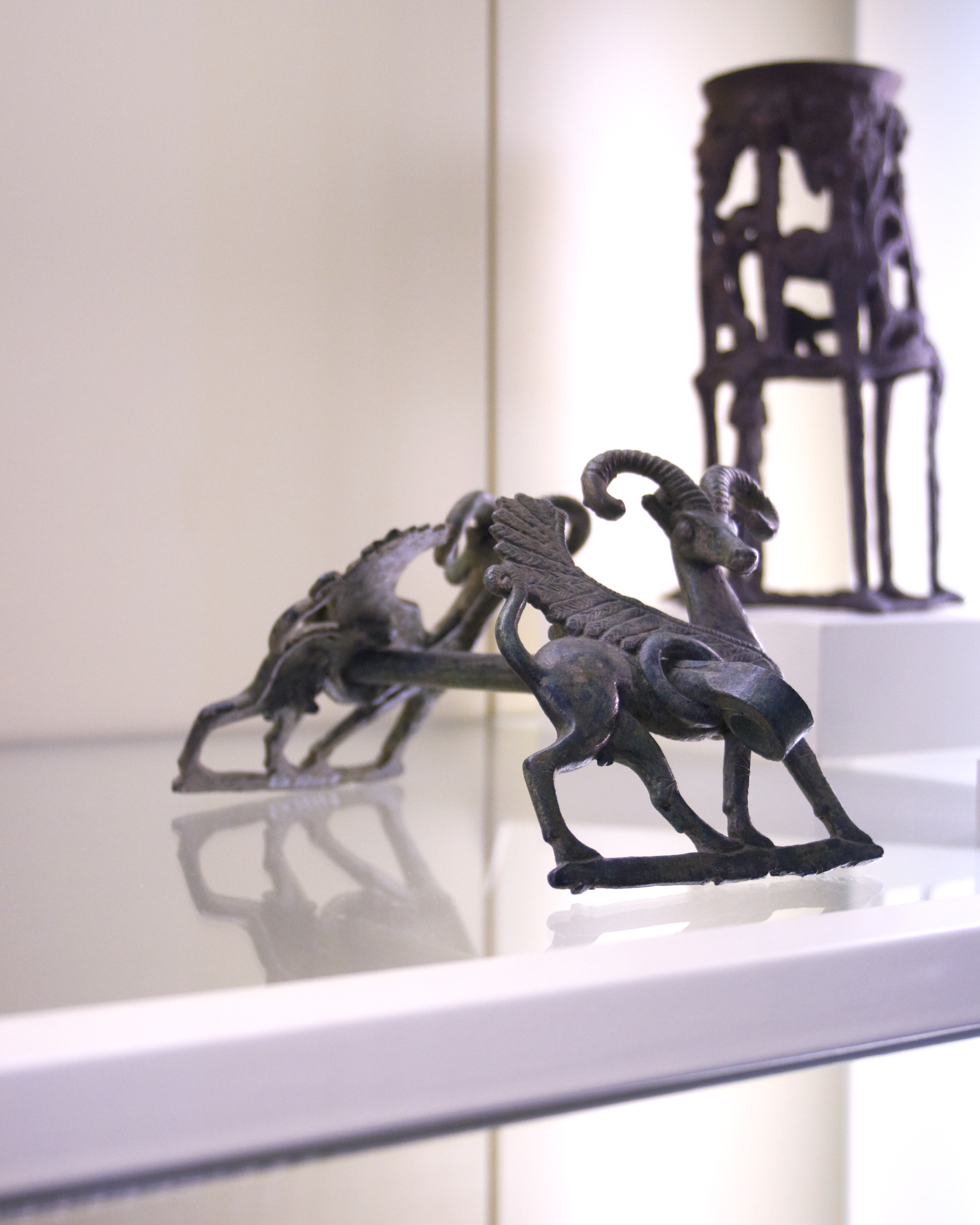
A Luristan bronze horse bit

The presence of bit wear is an indicator that a horse was ridden or driven, and the earliest of such evidence from a site in Kazakhstan dates to 3700-3500 BCE. The absence of bit wear on horse teeth is not conclusive evidence against domestication because horses can be ridden and controlled without bits by using a noseband or a hackamore, but such materials do not produce significant physiological changes nor are they apt to be preserved for millennia.

The regular use of a bit to control a horse can create wear facets or bevels on the anterior corners of the lower second premolars. The corners of the horse's mouth normally keep the bit on the "bars" of the mouth, an interdental space where there are no teeth, forward of the premolars. The bit must be manipulated by a human or the horse must move it with its tongue for it to touch the teeth. Wear can be caused by the bit abrading the front corners of the premolars if the horse grasps and releases the bit between its teeth; other wear can be created by the bit striking the vertical front edge of the lower premolars, due to very strong pressure from a human handler.

Modern experiments showed that even organic bits of rope or leather can create significant wear facets, and also showed that facets 3mm (.118 in) deep or more do not appear on the premolars of wild horses. However, other researchers disputed both conclusions.

Wear facets of 3 mm or more were found on seven horse premolars in two sites of the Botai culture, Botai and Kozhai 1, dated about 3700–3500 BCE. The Botai culture premolars are the earliest reported multiple examples of this dental pathology in any archaeological site, and preceded any skeletal change indicators by 1,000 years. While wear facets more than 3 mm deep were discovered on the lower second premolars of a single stallion from Dereivka in Ukraine, an Eneolithic settlement dated about 4000 BCE, dental material from one of the worn teeth later produced a radiocarbon date of 700–200 BCE, indicating that this stallion was actually deposited in a pit dug into the older Eneolithic site during the Iron Age.

=== Dung and corrals ===
Soil scientists working with Sandra Olsen of the Carnegie Museum of Natural History at the Chalcolithic settlements of Botai and Krasnyi Yar in northern Kazakhstan found layers of horse dung, discarded in unused house pits in both settlements. The collection and disposal of horse dung suggests that horses were confined in corrals or stables. An actual corral, dated to 3500–3000 BCE was identified at Krasnyi Yar by a pattern of post holes for a circular fence, with the soils inside the fence yielding ten times more phosphorus than the soils outside. The phosphorus could represent the remains of manure.

=== Geographic expansion ===
The appearance of horse remains in human settlements in regions where they had not previously been present is another indicator of domestication. Although images of horses appear as early as the Upper Paleolithic period in places such as the caves of Lascaux, France, suggesting that wild horses lived in regions outside of the Eurasian steppes before domestication and may have even been hunted by early humans, concentration of remains suggests animals being deliberately captured and contained, an indicator of domestication, at least for food, if not necessarily use as a working animal.

Around 3500–3000 BCE, horse bones began to appear more frequently in archaeological sites beyond their center of distribution in the Eurasian steppes and were seen in central Europe, the middle and lower Danube valley, and the North Caucasus and Transcaucasia. Evidence of horses in these areas had been rare before, and as numbers increased, larger animals also began to appear in horse remains. This expansion in range was contemporary with the Botai culture, where there are indications that horses were corralled and ridden. This does not necessarily mean that horses were first domesticated in the steppes, but the horse-hunters of the steppes certainly pursued wild horses more than in any other region.

European wild horses were hunted for up to 10% of the animal bones in a handful of Mesolithic and Neolithic settlements scattered across Spain, France, and the marshlands of northern Germany, but in many other parts of Europe, including Greece, the Balkans, the British Isles, and much of central Europe, horse bones do not occur or occur very rarely in Mesolithic, Neolithic or Chalcolithic sites. In contrast, wild horse bones regularly exceeded 40% of the identified animal bones in Mesolithic and Neolithic camps in the Eurasian steppes, west of the Ural Mountains.

Horse bones were rare or absent in Neolithic and Chalcolithic kitchen garbage in western Turkey, Mesopotamia, most of Iran, South and Central Asia, and much of Europe. While horse bones have been identified in Neolithic sites in central Turkey, all equids together totaled less than 3% of the animal bones. Within this three percent, horses were less than 10%, with 90% or more of the equids represented by onagers (Equus hemionus) or another ass-like equid that later became extinct, the hydruntine or European wild ass (Equus hydruntinus). Onagers were the most common native wild equids of the Near East. They were hunted in Syria, Anatolia, Mesopotamia, Iran, and Central Asia; and domesticated asses (Equus asinus) were imported into Mesopotamia, probably from Egypt, but wild horses apparently did not live there.

==== Other evidence of geographic expansion ====
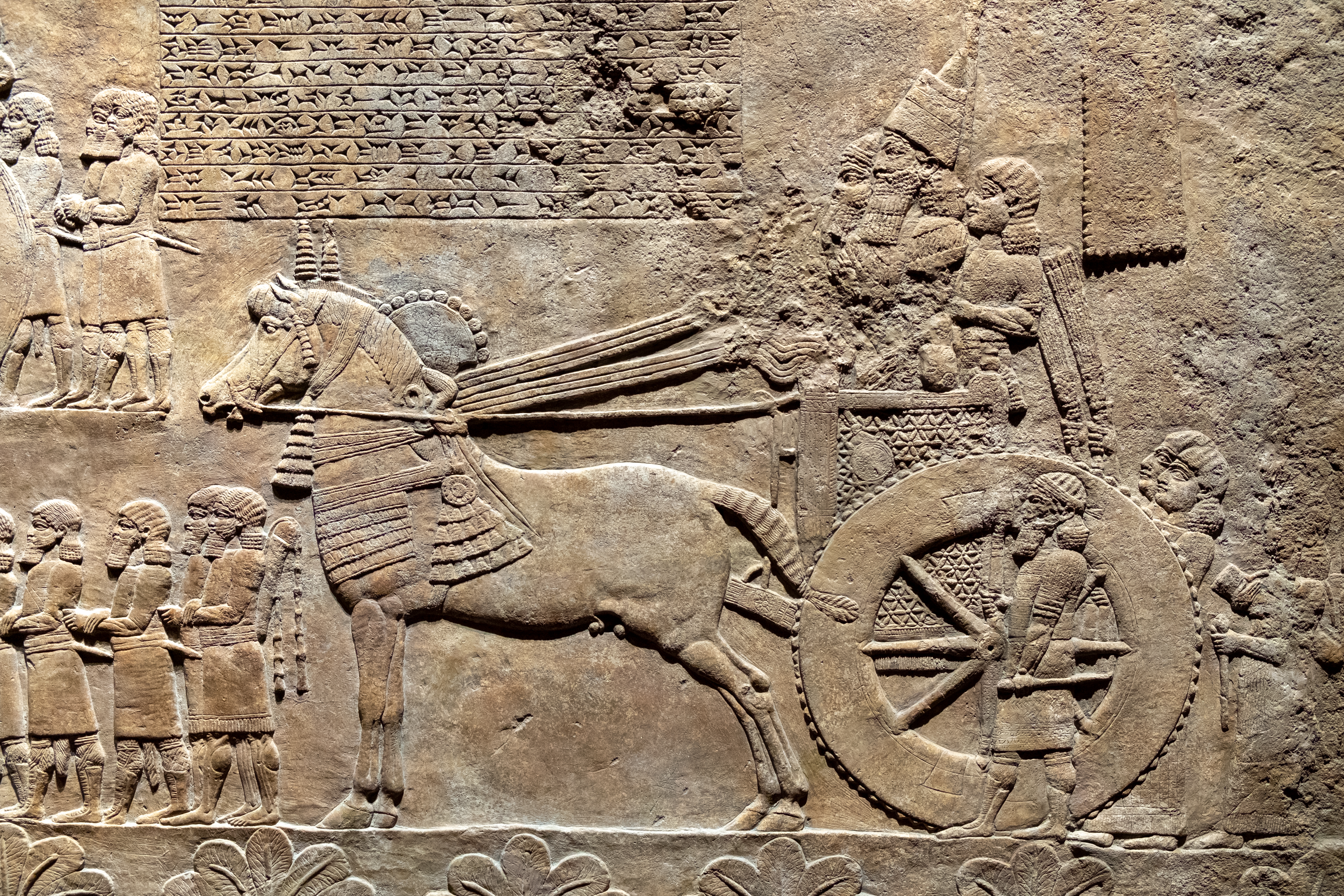
Relief depicting Assyrian king Ashurbanipal in a chariot, inspecting booty and prisoners from Babylon

In Northern Caucasus, the Maikop culture settlements and burials of c. 3300 BC contain both horse bones and images of horses. A frieze of nineteen horses painted in black and red colours is found in one of the Maikop graves. The widespread appearance of horse bones and images in Maikop sites suggest to some observers that horseback riding began in the Maikop period.

Later, images of horses, identified by their short ears, flowing manes, and tails that bushed out at the dock, began to appear in artistic media in Mesopotamia during the Akkadian period, 2300–2100 BCE. The word for "horse", literally translated as ass of the mountains, first appeared in Sumerian documents during the Third dynasty of Ur, about 2100–2000 BCE. The kings of the Third Dynasty of Ur apparently fed horses to lions for royal entertainment, perhaps indicating that horses were still regarded as more exotic than useful, but King Shulgi, about 2050 BCE, compared himself to "a horse of the highway that swishes its tail", and one image from his reign showed a man apparently riding a horse at full gallop. Horses were imported into Mesopotamia and the lowland Near East in larger numbers after 2000 BCE in connection with the beginning of chariot warfare, replacing the long-established kunga (a hybrid between the now-extinct Syrian wild ass and a domestic donkey) as the main equid for warfare.

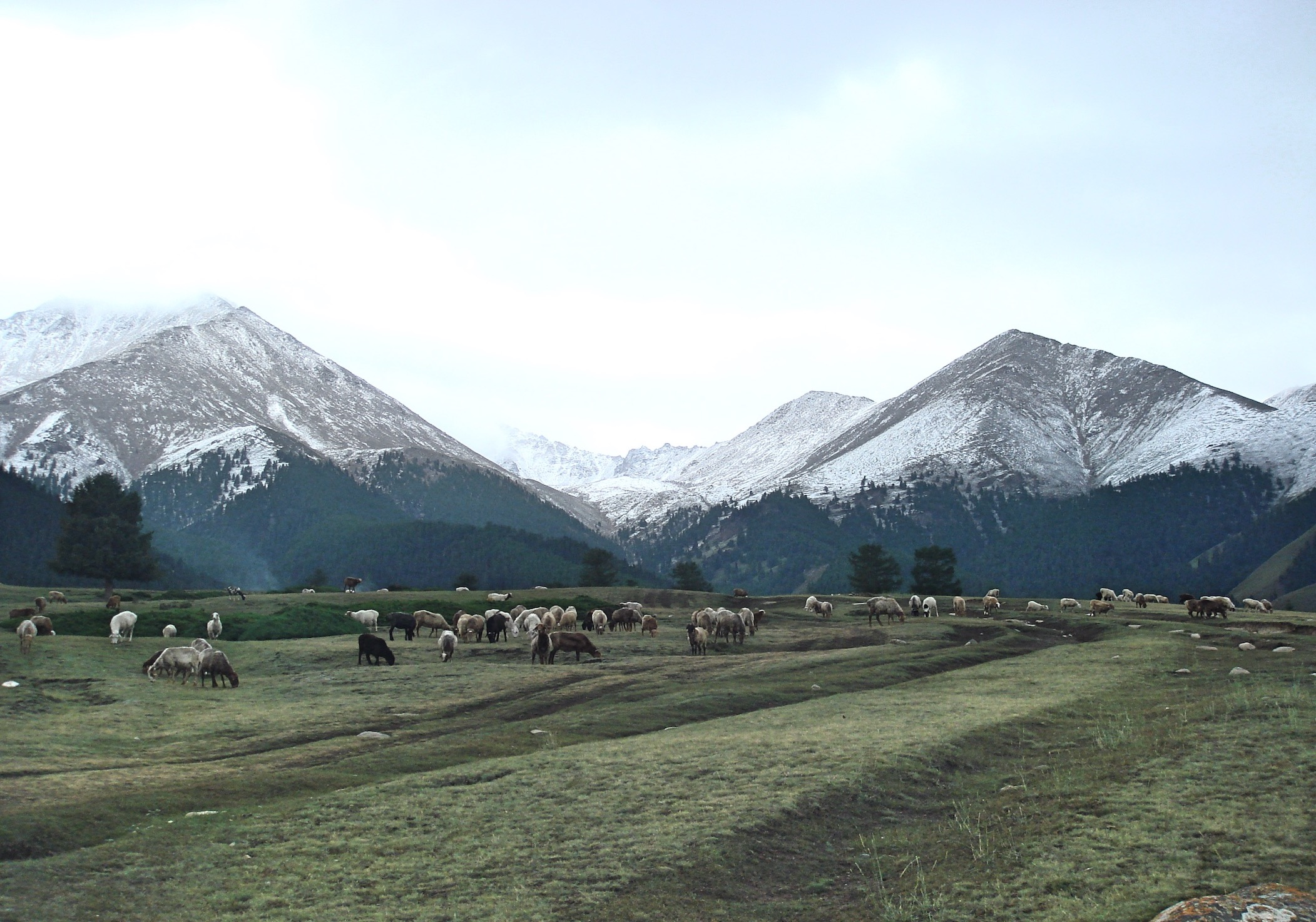
Surroundings of the Shirenzigou archaeological site in Barkol County.

A further expansion, into the lowland Near East and northwestern China, also happened around 2000 BCE. Although Equus bones of uncertain species are found in some Late Neolithic sites in China dated before 2000 BCE, Equus caballus or Equus ferus bones first appeared in multiple sites and in significant numbers in sites of the Qijia and Siba cultures, 2000–1600 BCE, in Gansu and the northwestern provinces of China. Skeletal evidence from sites in Shirenzigou and Xigou in eastern Xinjiang indicate that by the fourth century BCE both horseback riding and mounted archery were practiced along China's northwest frontier.

A few horse bones, and an iron horse bit, have been found at Gandhara grave culture (c. 1200 - 800 BCE) sites, of Pakistan's, Swat Valley. While the contemporary Vedas (c. 1500–500 BCE) make numerous references to both the use of horses and chariots within the Indian subcontinent.

In 2008, archaeologists announced the discovery of rock art in Somalia's northern Dhambalin region, which the researchers suggest is one of the earliest known depictions of a hunter on horseback. The rock art is in the Ethiopian-Arabian style, dated to 1000 to 3000 BCE.

=== Horse images as symbols of power ===
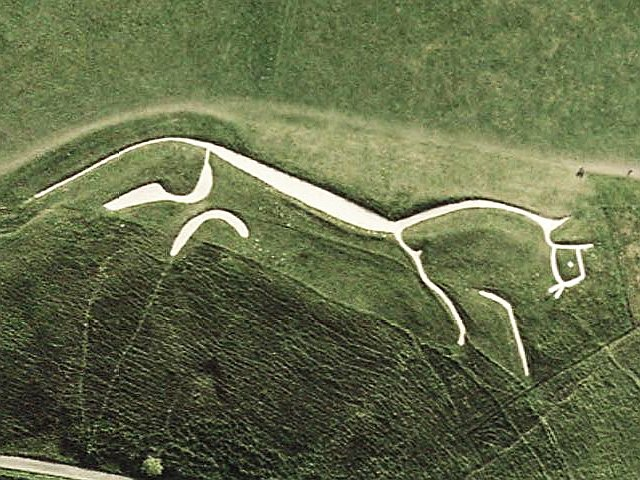
The Uffington White Horse, a British Bronze Age chalk-carved figure associated with the construction of a nearby hill fort.

About 4200-4000 BCE, more than 500 years before the geographic expansion evidenced by the presence of horse bones, new kinds of graves, named after a grave at Suvorovo, appeared north of the Danube delta in the coastal steppes of Ukraine near Izmail. Suvorovo graves were similar to and probably derived from earlier funeral traditions in the steppes around the Dnieper River. Some Suvorovo graves contained polished stone mace-heads shaped like horse heads and horse tooth beads. Earlier steppe graves also had contained polished stone mace-heads, some of them carved in the shape of animal heads. Settlements in the steppes contemporary with Suvorovo, such as Sredni Stog II and Dereivka on the Dnieper River, contained 12–52% horse bones.

When Suvorovo graves appeared in the Danube delta grasslands, horse-head maces also appeared in some of the indigenous farming towns of the Trypillia and Gumelnitsa cultures in present-day Romania and Moldova, near the Suvorovo graves. These agricultural cultures had not previously used polished-stone maces, and horse bones were rare or absent in their settlement sites. Probably their horse-head maces came from the Suvorovo immigrants. The Suvorovo people in turn acquired many copper ornaments from the Trypillia and Gumelnitsa towns. After this episode of contact and trade, but still during the period 4200–4000 BCE, about 600 agricultural towns in the Balkans and the lower Danube valley, some of which had been occupied for 2000 years, were abandoned. Copper mining ceased in the Balkan copper mines, and the cultural traditions associated with the agricultural towns were terminated in the Balkans and the lower Danube valley. This collapse of "Old Europe" has been attributed to the immigration of mounted Indo-European warriors. The collapse could have been caused by intensified warfare, for which there is some evidence; and warfare could have been worsened by mounted raiding; and the horse-head maces have been interpreted as indicating the introduction of domesticated horses and riding just before the collapse.

However, mounted raiding is just one possible explanation for this complex event. Environmental deterioration, ecological degradation from millennia of farming, and the exhaustion of easily mined oxide copper ores also are cited as causal factors.

=== Artifacts ===
Perforated antler objects discovered at Derievka (mistakenly, Dereivka) and other sites contemporary with Suvorovo have been identified as cheekpieces or psalia for horse bits. This identification is no longer widely accepted, as the objects in question have not been found associated with horse bones, and could have had a variety of other functions. However, through studies of microscopic wear, it has been established that many of the bone tools at Botai were used to smooth rawhide thongs, and rawhide thongs might have been used in the manufacture of rawhide cords and ropes, useful for horse tack. Similar bone thong-smoothers are known from many other steppe settlements, but it cannot be known how the thongs were used. The oldest artifacts clearly identified as horse tack—bits, bridles, cheekpieces, or any other kind of horse gear—are the antler disk-shaped cheekpieces associated with the invention of the chariot, at the Sintashta-Petrovka sites.

=== Horses interred in human graves ===
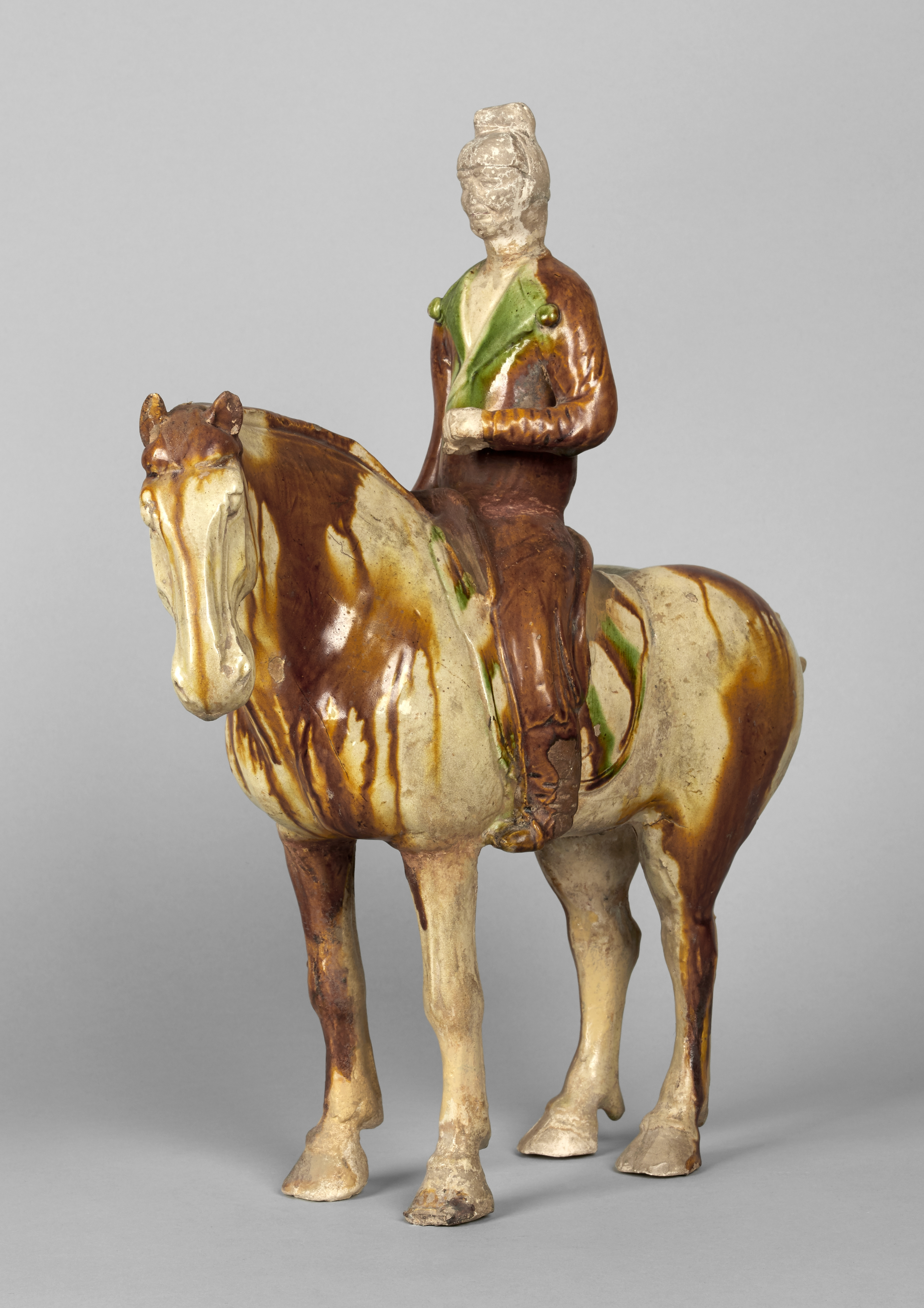
In China, Tang dynasty tomb figures include pottery figures of horses.

The oldest possible archaeological indicator of a changed relationship between horses and humans is the appearance about 4800–4400 BCE of horse bones and carved images of horses in Chalcolithic graves of the early Khvalynsk culture and the Samara culture in the middle Volga region of Russia. At the fifth-millennium BCE Khvalynsk cemetery near the town of Khvalynsk, as of March 2022, 201 graves of this period had been recorded. Of these, 26 graves contained parts of sacrificed domestic animals, and additional sacrifices occurred in ritual deposits on the original ground surface above the graves. Ten graves contained parts of lower horse legs; two of these also contained the bones of domesticated cattle and sheep. At least 106 domesticated sheep or goats, 29 domesticated cattle, and 16 horses were sacrificed at Khvalynsk. The inclusion of horses with cattle and sheep and the exclusion of obviously wild animals together suggest that horses were categorized symbolically with domesticated animals.

At S'yezzhe, a contemporary cemetery of the Samara culture, parts of two horses were placed above a group of human graves. The pair of horses here was represented by the head and hooves, probably originally attached to hides. The same ritual—using the hide with the head and lower leg bones as a symbol for the whole animal—was used for many domesticated cattle and sheep sacrifices at Khvalynsk. Horse images carved from bone were placed in the above-ground ochre deposit at S'yezzhe and occurred at several other sites of the same period in the middle and lower Volga region. Together these archaeological clues suggest that horses had a symbolic importance in the Khvalynsk and Samara cultures that they had lacked earlier, and that they were associated with humans, domesticated cattle, and domesticated sheep. Thus, the earliest phase in the domestication of the horse might have begun during the period 4800-4400 BCE.

== Methods of domestication ==
Equidae died out in the Western Hemisphere at the end of the last glacial period. A question raised is why and how horses avoided this fate on the Eurasian continent. It has been theorized that domestication saved the species. While the environmental conditions for equine survival were somewhat more favorable in Eurasia than in the Americas, the same stressors that led to extinction for the mammoth had an effect upon horse populations. Thus, some time after 8000 BCE, the approximate date of extinction in the Americas, humans in Eurasia may have begun to keep horses as a livestock food source, and by keeping them in captivity, may have helped to preserve the species. Horses also fit the six core criteria for livestock domestication, and thus, it could be argued, "chose" to live in close proximity to humans.

One model of horse domestication starts with individual foals being kept as pets while the adult horses were slaughtered for meat. Foals are relatively small and easy to handle. Horses behave as herd animals and need companionship to thrive. Both historic and modern data shows that foals can and will bond to humans and other domestic animals to meet their social needs. Thus domestication may have started with young horses who were predisposed to docility being repeatedly bred as pets, preceding the great discovery that these pets could be ridden or otherwise put to work.

However, there is disagreement over the definition of the term domestication. One interpretation of domestication is that it must include physiological changes associated with being selectively bred in captivity, and not merely "tamed." It has been noted that traditional peoples worldwide (both hunter-gatherers and horticulturists) routinely tame individuals from wild species, typically by hand-rearing infants whose parents have been killed, and these animals are not necessarily "domesticated."

On the other hand, some researchers look to examples from historical times to hypothesize how domestication occurred. For example, while Native American cultures captured and rode horses from the 16th century onwards, most tribes did not exert significant control over their breeding, thus their horses developed a genotype and phenotype adapted to the uses and climatological conditions in which they were kept, making them more of a landrace than a planned breed as defined by modern standards, but nonetheless "domesticated".

== Horses in historic warfare ==
While riding may have been practiced during the 4th and 3rd millennia BCE, and the disappearance of "Old European" settlements may be related to attacks by horseback-mounted warriors, the clearest influence by horses on ancient warfare was by pulling chariots, introduced around 2000 BCE.

Horses in the Bronze Age were relatively small by modern standards, which led some theorists to believe the ancient horses were too small to be ridden and so must have been used for driving. Herodotus' description of the Sigynnae, a steppe people who bred horses too small to ride but extremely efficient at drawing chariots, illustrates this stage. However, as horses remained generally smaller than modern equines well into the Middle Ages, this theory is highly questionable.

The Iron Age in Mesopotamia saw the rise of mounted cavalry as a tool of war, as evidenced by the notable successes of mounted archer tactics used by various invading eurasian nomads such as the Parthians. Over time, the chariot gradually became obsolete.

The horse of the Iron Age was still relatively small, perhaps 12.2 to 14.2 hands (50 to 58 inches, 127 to 147 cm) high (measured at the withers.) This was shorter overall than the average height of modern riding horses, which range from about 14.2 to 17.2 hands (58 to 70 inches, 147 to 178 cm). However, small horses were used successfully as light cavalry for many centuries. For example, Fell ponies, believed to be descended from Roman cavalry horses, are comfortably able to carry fully grown adults (although with rather limited ground clearance) at an average height of 13.2 hands (54 inches, 137 cm) Likewise, the Arabian horse is noted for a short back and dense bone, and the successes of the Muslims against the heavy mounted knights of Europe demonstrated that a horse standing 14.2 hands (58 inches, 147 cm) can easily carry a full-grown human adult into battle.

Mounted warriors such as the Scythians, Huns and Vandals of late Roman antiquity, the Turks and Mongols who invaded eastern Europe in the 7th century through 14th centuries CE, the Arab warriors of the 7th through 14th centuries CE, and the Native Americans in the 16th through 19th centuries each demonstrated effective forms of light cavalry.

== See also ==
- Anthrozoology
- Equestrian nomad
- History of horse domestication theories
