= Botai =

Botai Ботай
- Village
- Location within Kazakhstan
- Coordinates: 53.303°N 67.645°E
- Country: Kazakhstan
- Region: North Kazakhstan Region
- District: Aiyrtau District

Population (2009)
  - Total: 84

Botai (Kazakh: Ботай [botʰɑ́j]) is a village in Aiyrtau District, North Kazakhstan. Its KATO code is 593246200.

The village gives its name to the Botai archaeological site, which dates to the Eneolithic period (c. 3500 BCE) and has produced some of the earliest evidence for the domestication of the horse.
