= Botai culture =

Archaeological culture of northern Central Asia

Coordinates: 53.303°N 67.645°E

- The Botai culture, with contemporary cultures c. 3000 BC.
- Horizon: Indigenous peoples of Siberia
- Period: Bronze Age
- Dates: c. 3700 BC - 3100 BC
- Major sites: Botai, Krasny Yar
- Preceded by: Surtandy culture
- Followed by: Karasuk culture, Andronovo culture, Seima-Turbino phenomenon, Tagar culture

The Botai culture is an archaeological culture (c. 3700–3100 BC) of prehistoric northern Central Asia. It was named after the settlement of Botai in today's northern Kazakhstan. The Botai culture has two other large sites: Krasnyi Yar, and Vasilkovka.

The Botai site is on the Imanburlyq, a tributary of the Ishim. The site has at least 153 pit-houses. The settlement was partly destroyed by river erosion, which is still occurring, and by management of the wooded area.

== Archaeology ==
The Botai culture emerged with the transition from a nomadic hunter-gatherer lifestyle with a variety of game to a sedentary lifestyle with a diet that relied heavily on horse meat. The settlements of the Botai consisted of pit-houses and were relatively large and permanent, the largest being the type site at Botai with over 160 houses. The population of the Botai culture has been connected to the earliest evidence for horse husbandry. Enormous amounts of horse bones were found in and around the Botai settlements, along with corral-like enclosures and large amounts of horse dung, suggesting that the Botai people kept horses or even domesticated them. Archaeological data suggests that the Botai were sedentary pastoralists and also domesticated dogs.

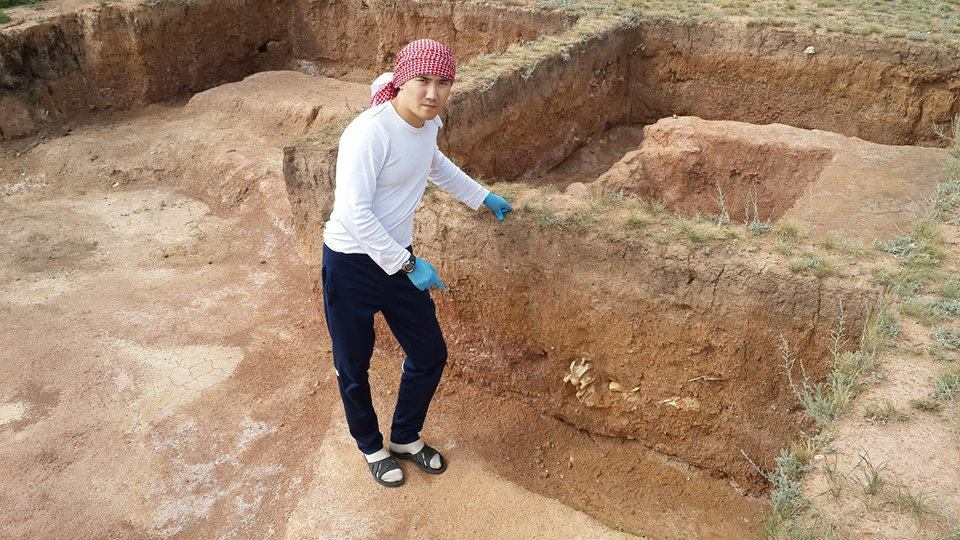
Ancient settlement at Botai, discovered in 1980.

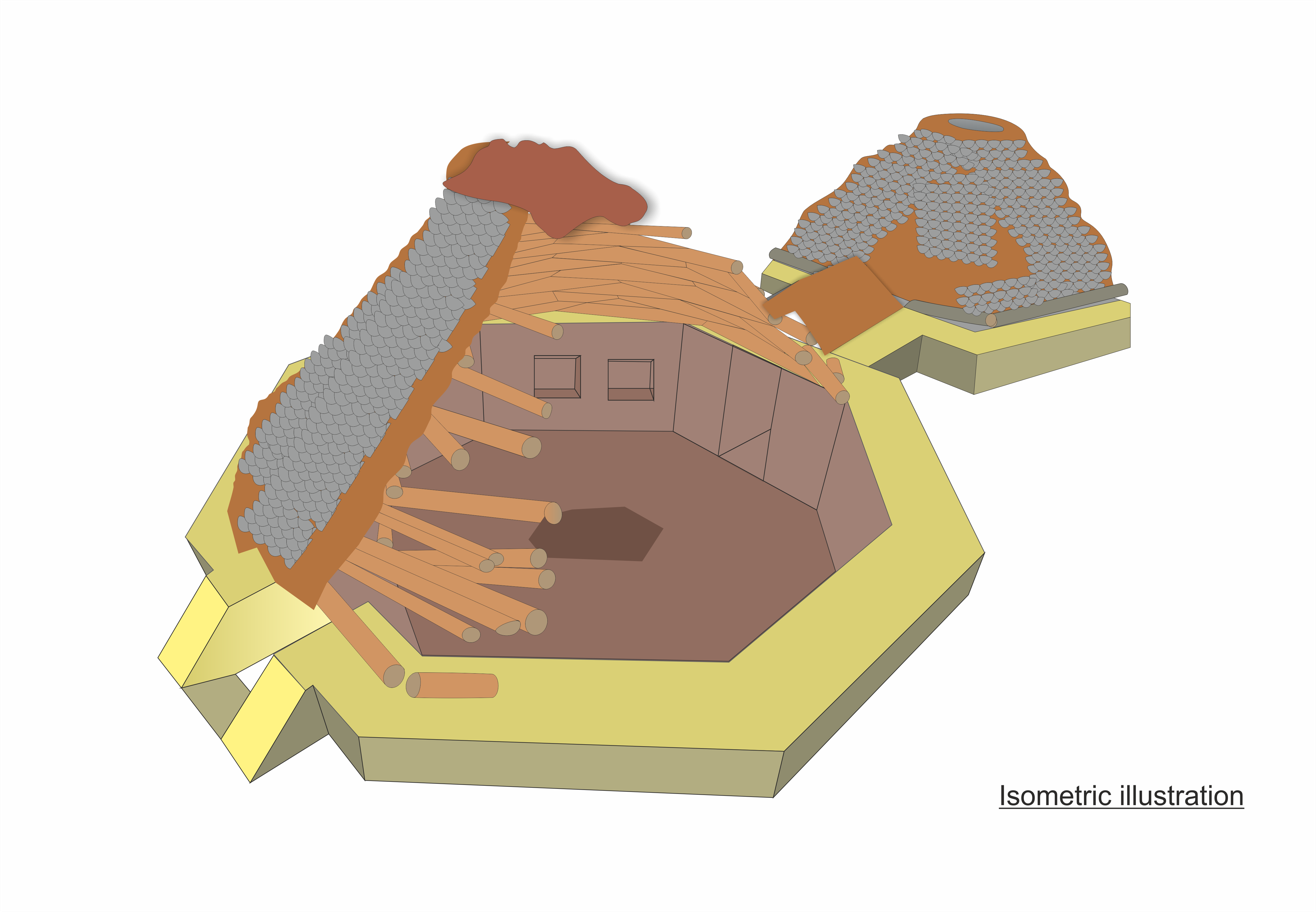
3-D reconstruction of a Botai dwelling

A number of researchers state that horses were domesticated locally by the Botai. It was once thought that most of the horses in evidence were probably the wild species, Equus ferus, hunted with bows, arrows, and spears. However, evidence reported in 2009 for pottery containing mare's milk and of horse bones with telltale signs of being bred after domestication have demonstrated a much stronger case for the Botai culture as a major user of domestic horses by about 3,500 BC, close to 1,000 years earlier than the previous scientific consensus. Botai horses were primarily ancestors of Przewalski's horses, and contributed 2.7% ancestry to modern domestic horses. Thus, modern horses might have been domesticated in other centres of origin.

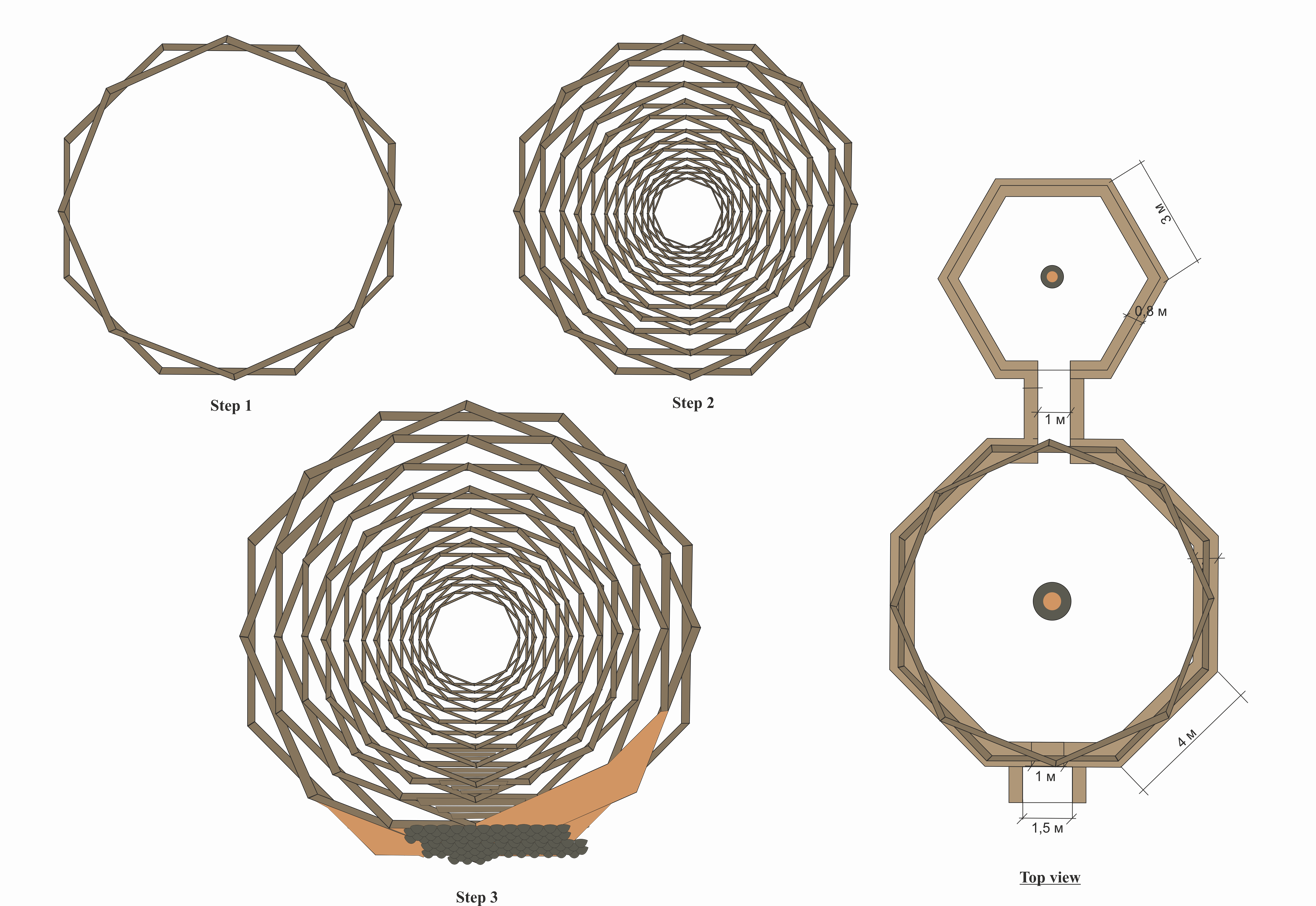
Illustration of a Botai house structure.

However, more recent studies analysing dental calculus suggest an absence of dairy product consumption among Botai culture individuals. This finding would potentially rule out previous conclusions about horses being milked using the presence of animal fats on pottery, unless milking was used for another purpose, such as hand-rearing domestic animals.

Damgaard et al. (2018) confirmed that the Botai horses were not the ancestors of the common modern horse Equus caballus but again argued that they were nonetheless domesticated. Three types of tooth and bone wear on Botai horse jaws show that bits were used to control horses (i.e. through the use of reins or bridles), and horse remains were found with the TRPM1 coat-colour locus, which causes leopard-spotted coats. Horses with two copies of this gene also have stationary night blindness. Being unable to see in dim light is a significant disadvantage in the wild on the steppes, so it is unlikely that leopard-spotted horses would survive to establish themselves in a population unless they were protected by people who valued them. Changes in coat color are a typical early marker of domestication, and have been associated with domestication in E. caballus.

Although contemporaneous to Copper Age and Early Bronze Age metal-working cultures in other parts of the Eurasian steppe, there is no evidence for metallurgy in Botai settlements. Tools were produced from stone and horse bones, with a shift in stone tool production from the microliths of the preceding nomadic hunter cultures to larger bifaces. The pottery of the culture had simple shapes, most examples being grey in colour and unglazed. The decorations are geometric, including hatched triangles and rhombi as well as step motifs. Punctates and circles were also used as decorative motifs.

== Language reconstruction ==
Asko Parpola suggests that the language of the Botai culture cannot be conclusively identified with any known language or language family. He suggests that the Proto-Ugric word *lox for "horse" is a borrowing from the language of the Botai culture. (Note: The Proto-Ugric word *lox is reconstructed from Hungarian ló, Mansi lū, and Khanty law, all meaning "horse". The word is neither of Uralic nor Indo-European origin, nor does it resemble any of the words for "horse" in known Eurasian language families.) However, Vladimir Napolskikh believes that it comes from Proto-Tocharian *l(ə)wa ("prey; livestock").

Václav Blažek reviewed an earlier proposal by Tamaz Gamkrelidze, who argued that the Botai people spoke a form of Yeniseian languages. According to him, linguistic data lends some support for a homeland of Yeniseian within the Central Asian Steppe, prior to its migration into Siberia. This language could have contributed some loanwords related to horsemanship and pastoralism, such as the word for horse (Yeniseian *ʔɨʔχ-kuʔs "stallion" and Indo-European *H₁ek̂wos "domesticated horse"), towards proto-Indo-European.

== Archaeogenetics ==
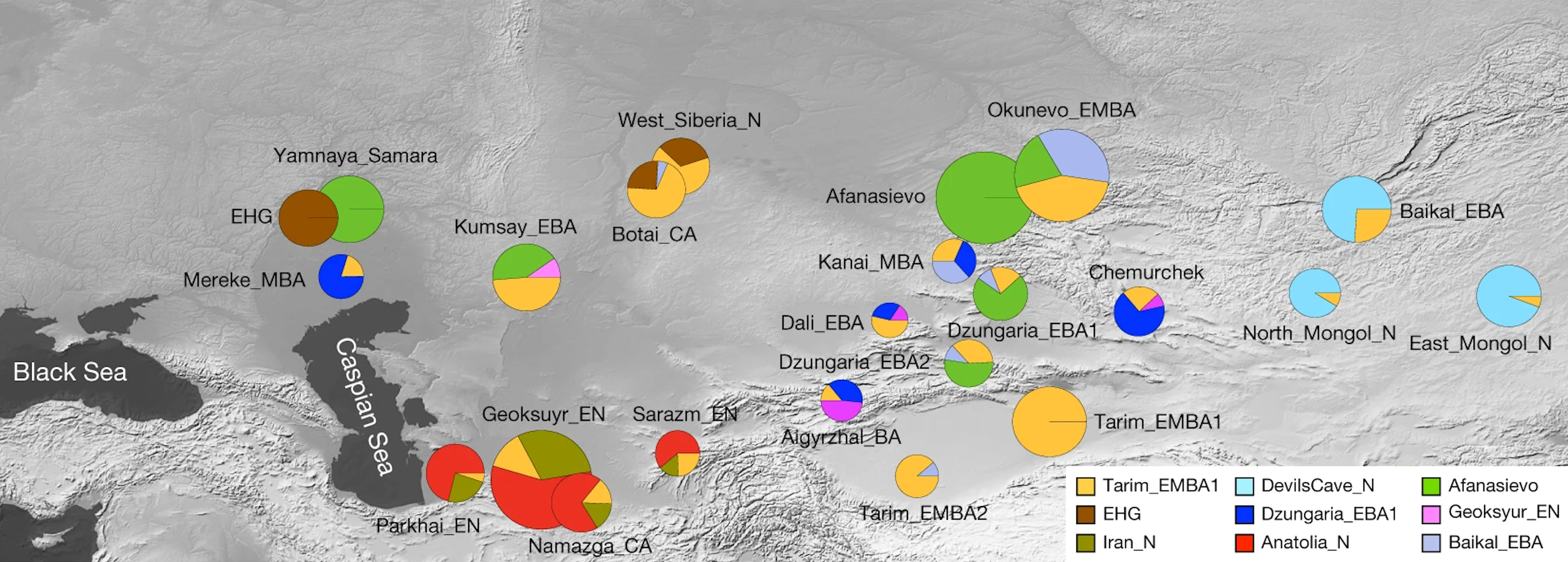
Central Asian admixtures: the Botai can be modelled as a combination of Tarim_EMBA ( ) and Eastern Hunter Gatherer ( ) genotypes, with a slight Baikal EBA ( ) admixture, but had no relation to the Yamnaya or Afanasievo ( ) pastoralists.

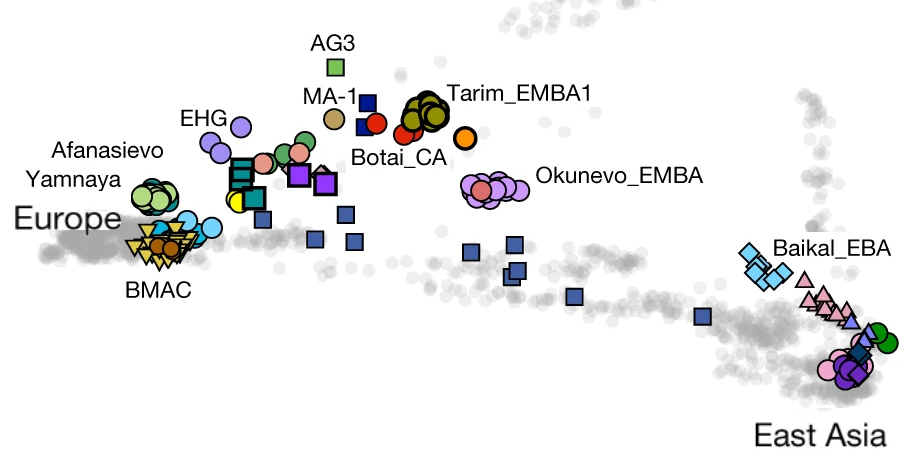
Genetic proximity of Botai populations to non-African modern human genomes (grey), and other ancient populations (colours). Principal component (PC) analysis.

Genetic analyses carried out on five Botai specimens, four of which turned out to be male, and one to be female, revealed high genetic affinity between them and "Western Siberian hunter-gatherers" (WSHG), a genetic cluster that is represented by three hunter-gatherer individuals dated ca. 5,000 BC from the Russian Forest Zone east of the Urals in Tyumen Oblast. Both derive their ancestry primarily from an Ancient North Eurasian-like ("ANE") source, with additional contributions from an "Ancient East Asian" (AEA) source at lower proportions, but slightly higher among the Botai compared to the WSHG. There is additional evidence for minor gene flow of a European hunter-gatherer-like ancestry into the Botai and WSHG, best represented by the Eastern Hunter-Gatherers, themselves having affinity to Ancient North Eurasians and Western Hunter-Gatherers.

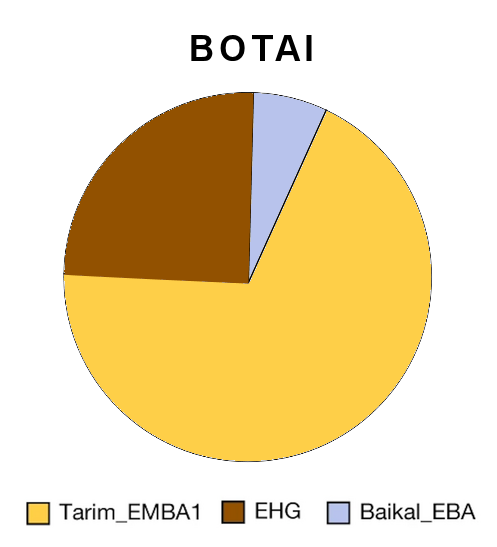
Botai CA (Genetic ancestry and admixture)

The Botai and the WSHG can be modeled as deriving ancestry primarily from an EHG-like and ANE-like source, with some gene flow from an AEA-like population. This model can be simplified into modeling the Botai and the WSHG to derive their ancestry from the combination of an EHG-like population and a population similar to the early Tarim mummies from Xinjiang (Tarim_EMBA1), who had the "fitting" combination of Ancient North Eurasian and Ancient East Asian components. The Botai, compared to the WSHG, however, needs a small additional AEA contribution. Different models estimated the overall Eastern Asian-related contributions for the Botai to be c. 17.0±2.2% (12—30%), with the remainder being associated with EHG and ANE-like components. The admixture event was estimated to have taken place about 7,000 BC.

Botai 14, dated to 3517–3108 cal BC, carried a derived allele at R1b1a1-M478, the lineage which currently occurs almost exclusively in non-Europeans and reaches the highest frequencies in Central Asia and Siberia, in particular in populations surrounding the Altai region. Botai 15, dated to 3343–3026 cal BC, belonged to the basal haplogroup N-M231. Regarding mitochondrial DNA, the Copper Age Botai sample BOT2016 belonged to the haplogroup Z1a, Botai 15 - to R1b1, and Botai 14 - to K1b2.

Two more Botai individuals were tested in September 2015. One sample belonged to the mitochondrial DNA haplogroup K1b2 and the paternal Haplogroup O-M268 (with 97.1% probability).

=== Decline and later population turnover ===
The Botai culture disappeared during the transition to the Bronze Age and did not develop into a clearly identifiable successor culture. Genetic analyses show that Botai individuals were distinct from later western steppe populations, while Botai-related ancestry persisted in parts of northern and eastern Kazakhstan into the Early Bronze Age. During the Middle and Late Bronze Age, populations associated with the Sintashta and Andronovo complexes expanded eastward and introduced substantial western Eurasian steppe-related ancestry into Central and northern Asia.

== Bibliography ==
- Damgaard, Peter de Barros; et al. (9 May 2018). "The first horse herders and the impact of early Bronze Age steppe expansions into Asia - Supplementary Material" (PDF). Science. 360 (6396). doi:10.1126/science.aar7711. PMC 6748862. PMID 29743352.
- Gaunitz, A.; et al. (22 February 2018). "Ancient genomes revisit the ancestry of domestic and Przewalski's horses" (PDF). Science. 360 (6384): 111–114. Bibcode:2018Sci...360..111G. doi:10.1126/science.aao3297. hdl:10871/31710. PMID 29472442. S2CID 3491575.
