= Khirigsuur =

Khirigsuur (kheregsüür, khirgisuur, kereksur, khereksur) is a type of Bronze Age burial, encountered in the Mongolic-speaking regions such as the Republic of Mongolia, Inner Mongolia, Buryatia and Tuva. It is composed of a central stone mound with a stone burial chamber generally beneath it, a stone enclosure, and external mounds and circles on the periphery. The etymology of the word is uncertain, though some groups of Mongols connect it with the Kyrgyz people.

In the 1980s, Yuly Khudyakov noted that Khirgisuur burials are frequently associated with deer stones. After his writings, the "Deer Stone culture" started to be called "Deer Stone-Khirgisuur Complex" (DSK). Chronologically, Khirgisuur burial sites belong to an earlier archaeological period compared to that of the Deer Stones, but they were appropriated by Deer Stone builders.

Kereksurs probably predate the spread of proto-Mongols in the region where they are found. They are associated with motifs of the sun, wheels, and chariots, which are typical for the Scythians and other Indo-Iranian peoples. Archaeologist Marina Kilunovskaya points out that kereksurs correspond to the Indo-Iranian structure of a segmented ring (e.g., exemplified by Arkaim). The deer stones accompanying kereksurs often depict proto-akinakes and other Scythian-like weaponry.

The radial surface design of kereksurs may have been inherited from the circular fortified settlements of the Sintashta culture and could prefigure the structure of the first royal Scythian burial mound (Arzhan-1, 10th century BCE).

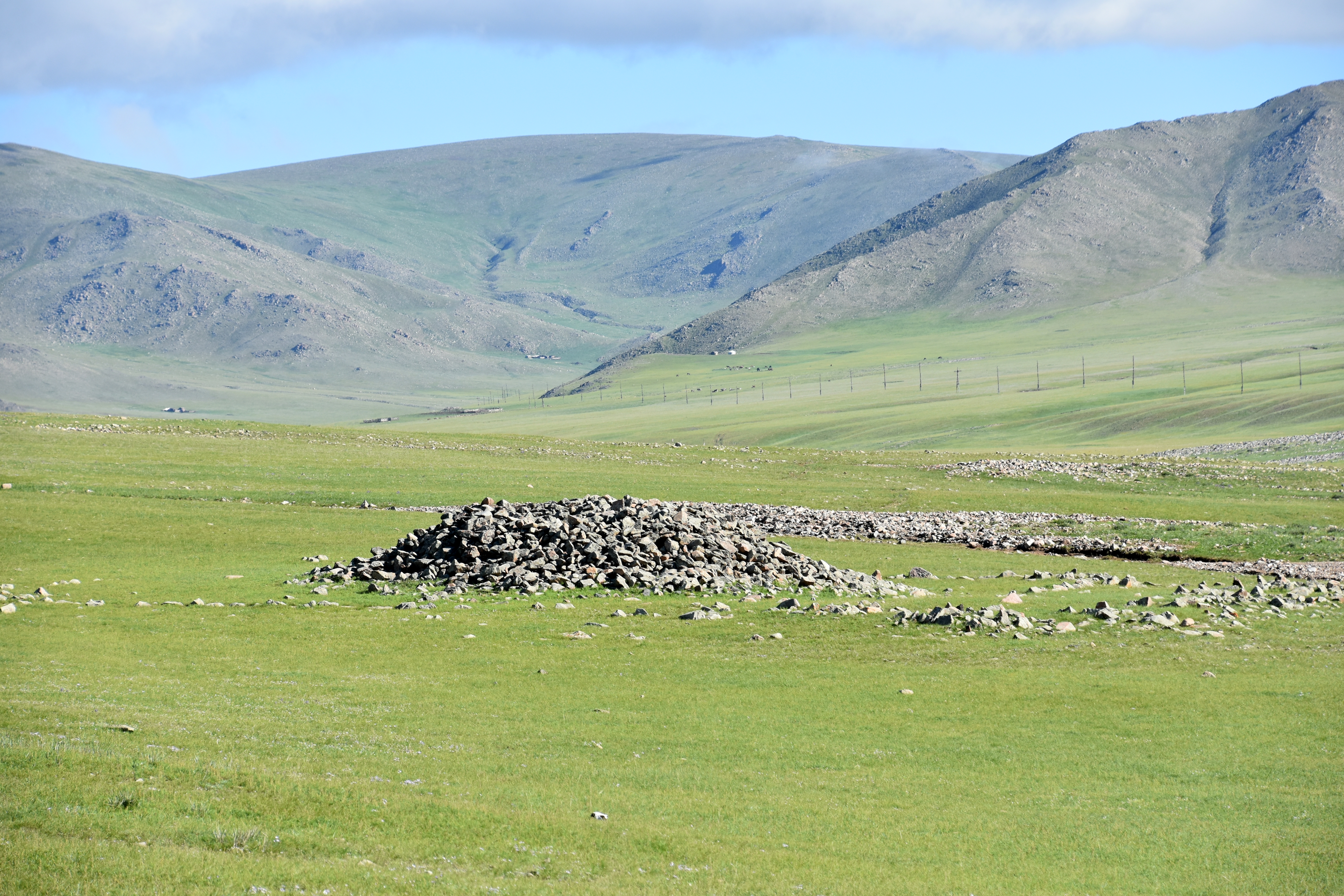
Bronze Age Khirigsuur burial mound in northern Mongolia near Jargalant

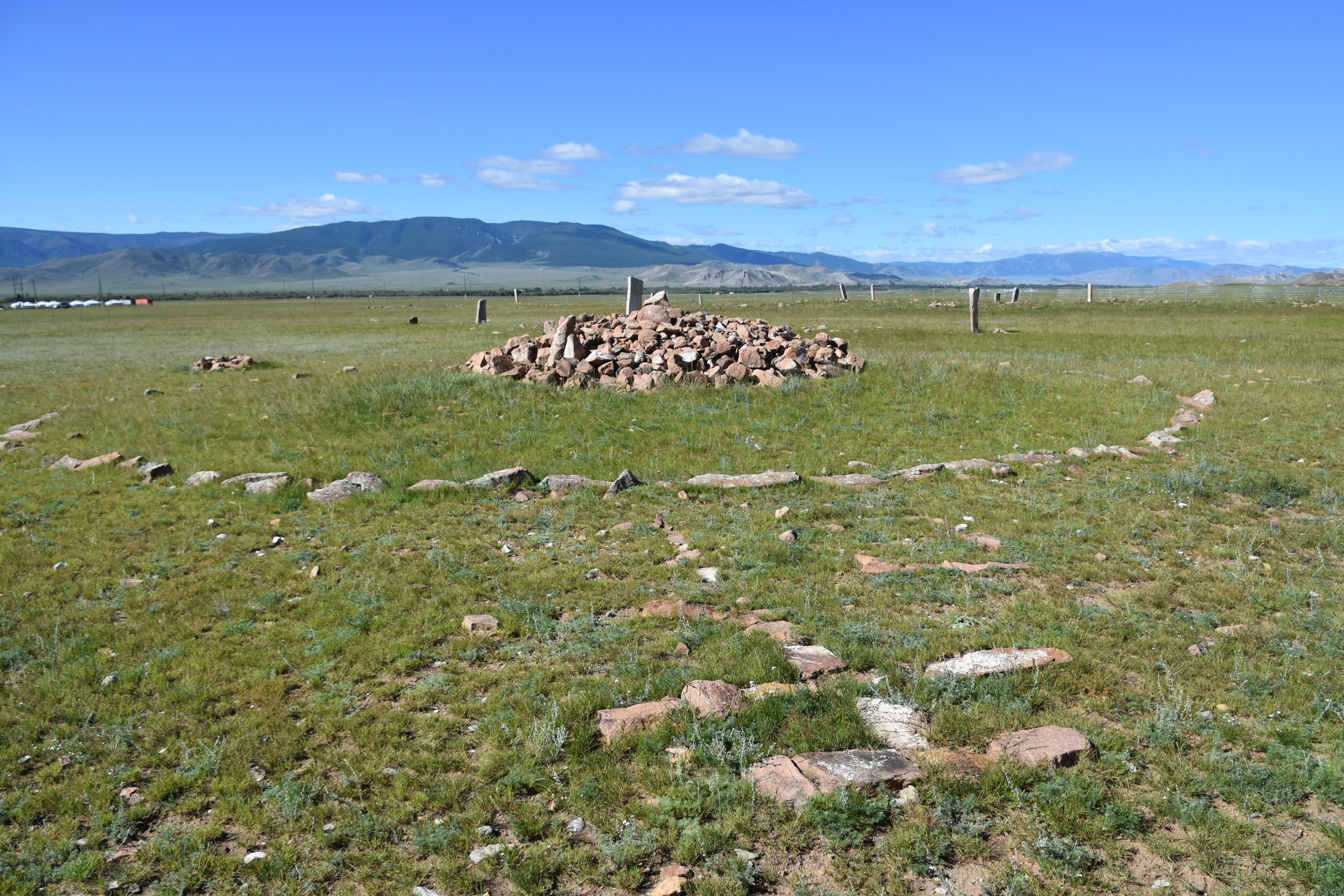
A Khirigsuur, with central mound of circular stone enclosure, near Mörön, Northern Mongolia

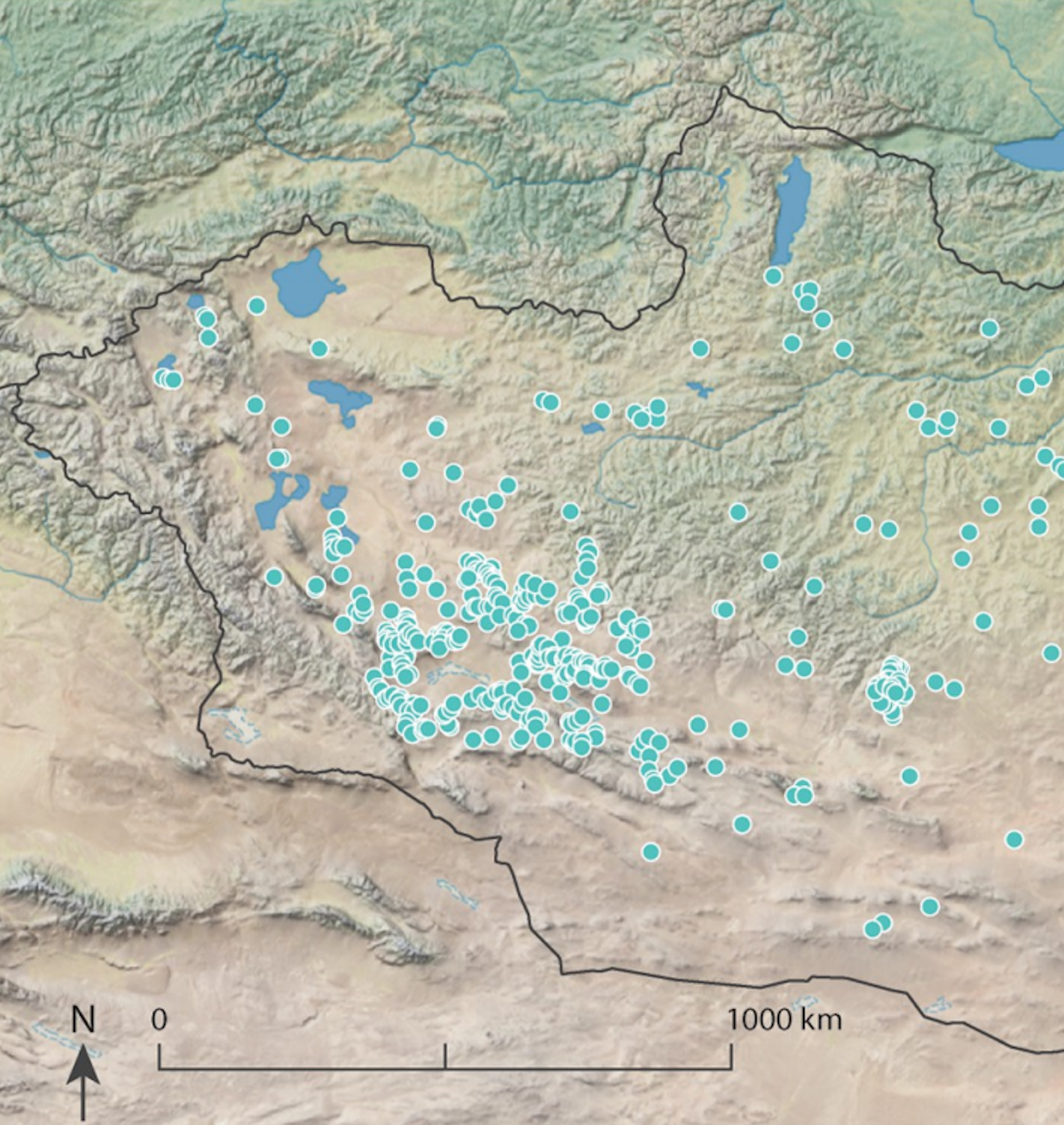
Khirgisuur sites in Mongolia

== Sources ==
- Jacobson-Tepfer, Esther (2023). "Deer Stones (pp.155–191)". Monumental Archaeology in the Mongolian Altai. Brill. doi:10.1163/9789004541306_008. ISBN 978-90-04-54130-6.
