= Krasnyi Yar (Kazakhstan) =

Coordinates: 53°19′50″N 69°11′11″E

Krasnyi Yar is an eneolithic site of the Botai culture in Kazakhstan. This large site is significant for the early use of horses there. Horse meat was eaten, but horses were also kept as livestock. Evidence from the presence of curved rows of postholes (indicative of fencing) and nitrogen and phosphates in the enclosed areas indicate a corral. The only livestock bones found at the site were from horses, so the inference by the researchers is that horses were held in corrals at the site.

Horse-bone tools indicate leather production, suggesting horse tack.

Botai sites have been found to have mare's milk residue in vessels and to have horses with tooth-wear interpreted as having been caused by using a bit for riding or traction.
