= Munkhkhairkhan culture =

Bronze Age culture of Mongolia

- Munkhkhairkhan culture and contemporary polities.
- Geographical range: Mongolia
- Period: Middle Bronze Age
- Dates: 1800 BCE — 1600 BCE
- Preceded by: Afanasievo culture Chemurchek culture
- Followed by: Sagsai culture Deer stones culture

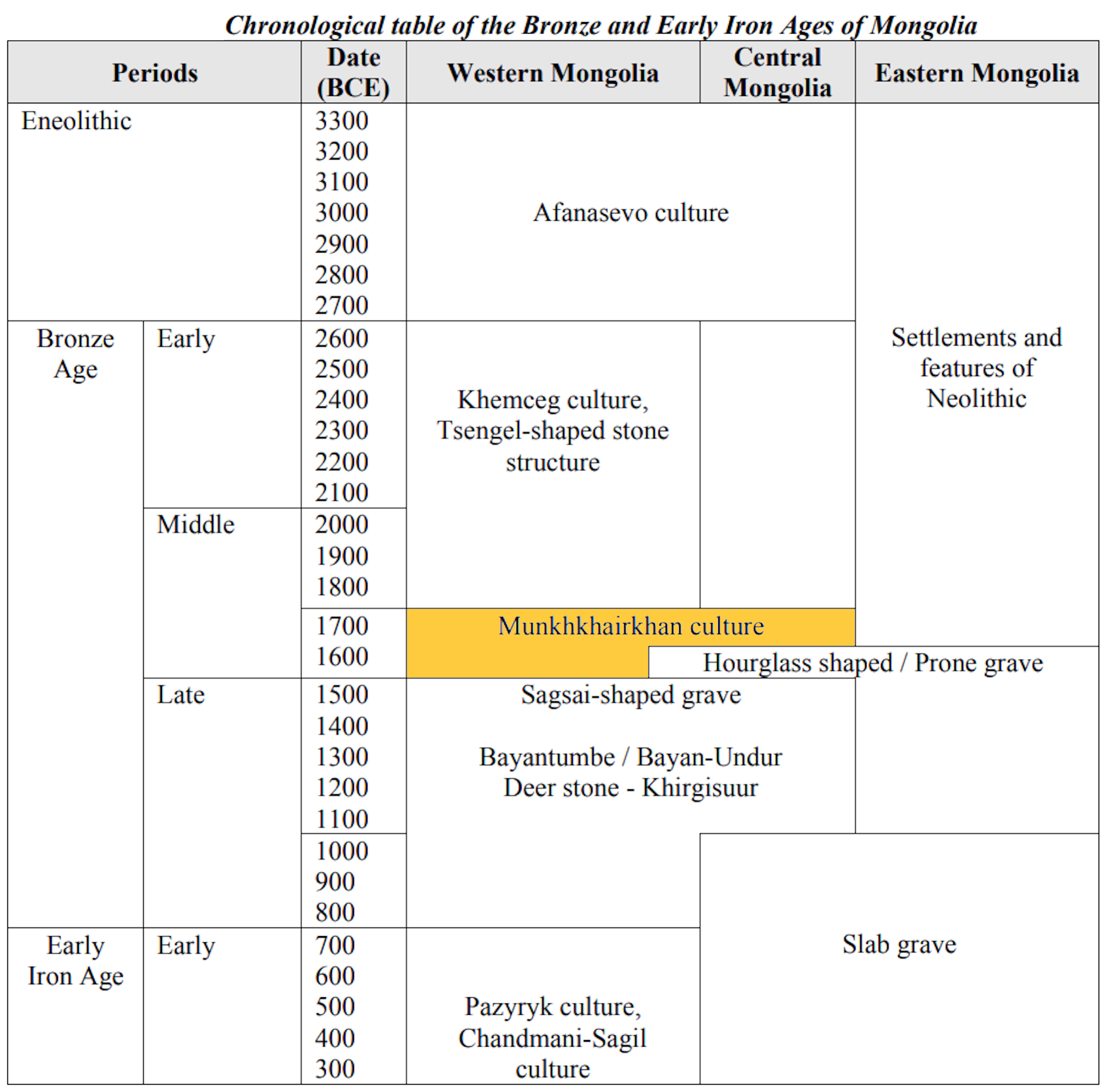
Chronological table of the Bronze and Early Iron Ages of Mongolia.

The Munkhkhairkhan culture, also Munkh-Khairkhan or Mönkhkhairkhan was a Middle Bronze Age culture of southern Siberia and western Mongolia, named after Mönkhkhairkhan Mountain in western Mongolia, and dating to 1800–1600 BCE. It immediately follows the Afanasievo culture and the Khemtseg culture. It was contemporary with the Andronovo culture, but its very existence suggests that the Androvo culture did not extend far into Mongolia.

Some of the best known sites of the Munkhkhairkhan culture are Ulaan Goviin Uzuur (UAA) 1&2 and Khukh Khoshuunii Boom (KHU).

The domestication of horses using carts for transportation, was one of the characteristics of the Munkhkhairkhan culture.

The Munkhkhairkhan culture had tin-bronze knives, of a type thought to have been developed in Western Siberia before 1900 BCE as part of the Seima-Turbino phenomenon. This knife technology was probably then transferred through Munkhkhairkhan to various Chinese cultures, such as the Qijia culture, Erlitou culture or Lower Xiajiadian culture, where very similar knives have been found.

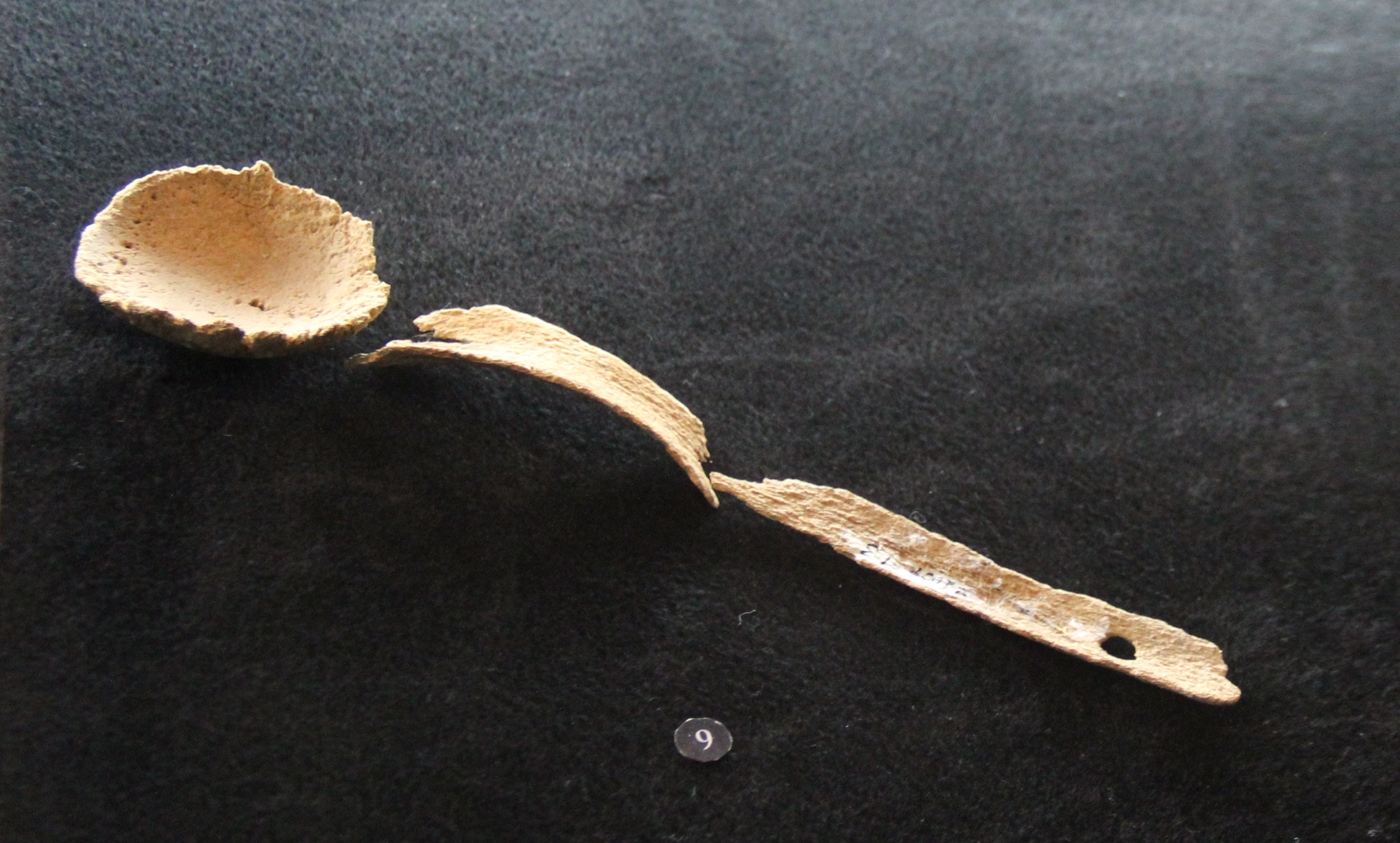
Bone spoon, Ulaan Goviin, 1800-1600 BCE. National Museum of Mongolia

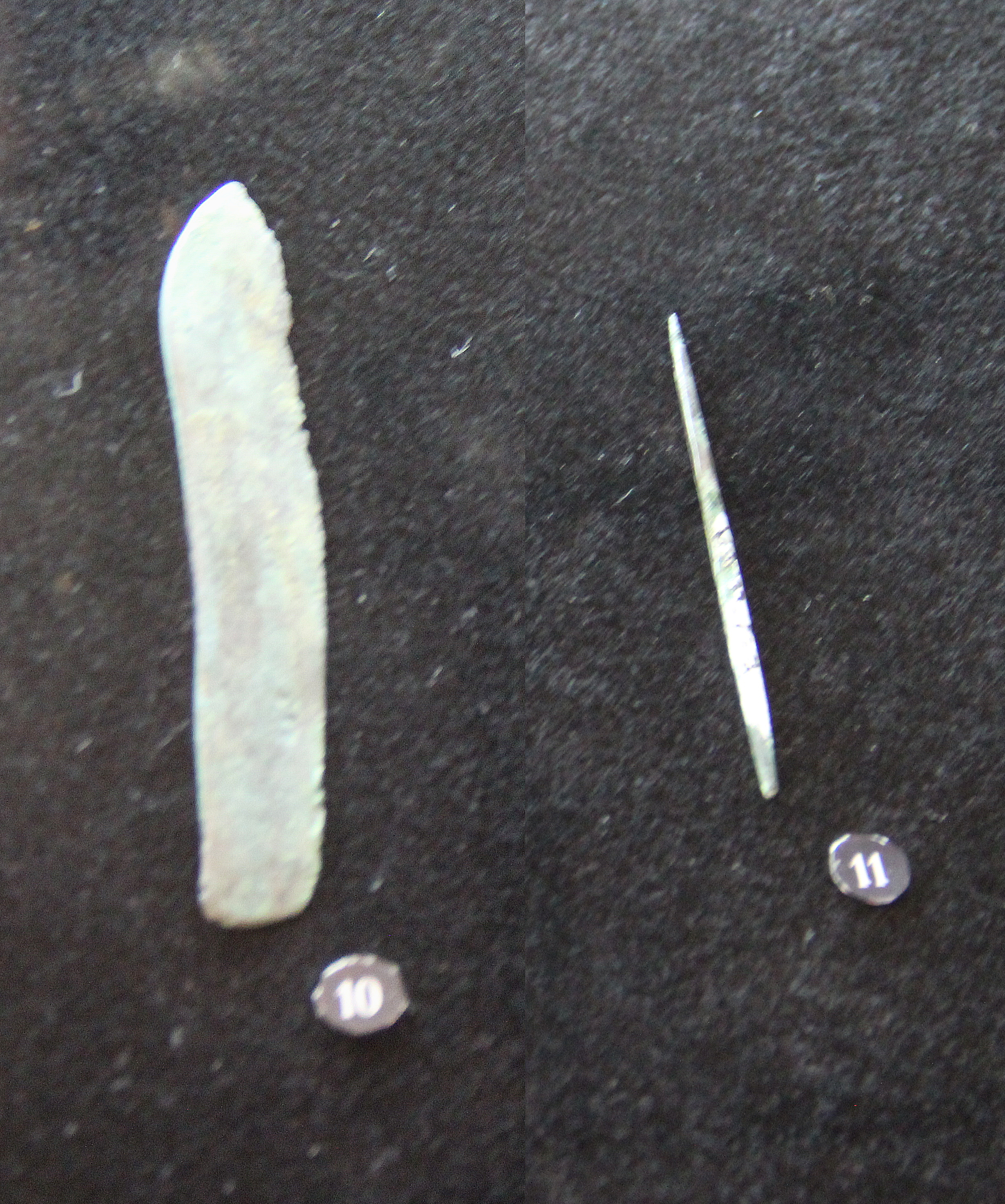
Bronze knife and awl, Ulaan Goviin, 1800-1600 BCE. National Museum of Mongolia

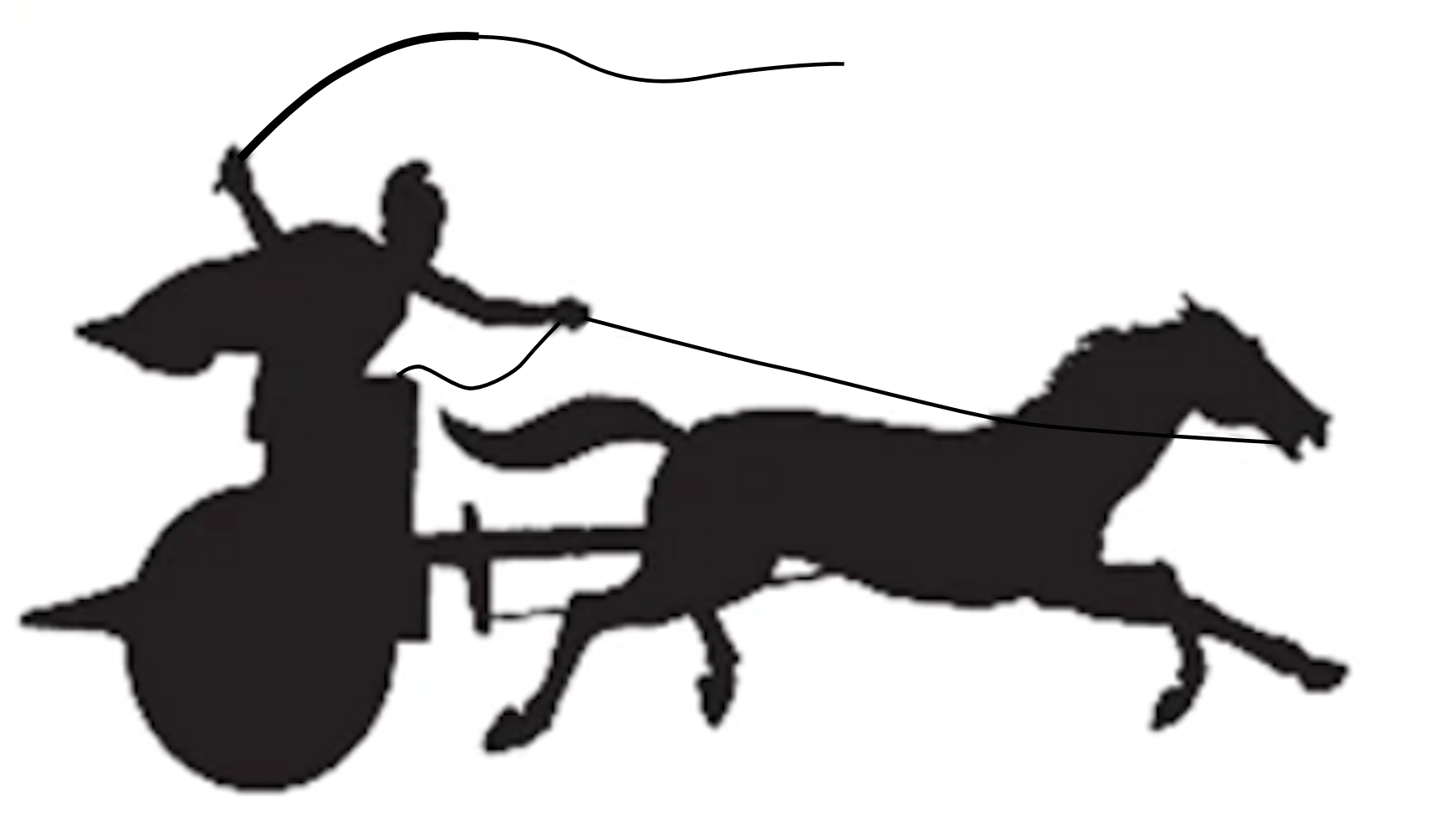
Hypothesized horse transport technology in use during the Munkhkhairkhan culture period.
