= Sagsai culture =

Early Bronze Age culture of Western Mongolia

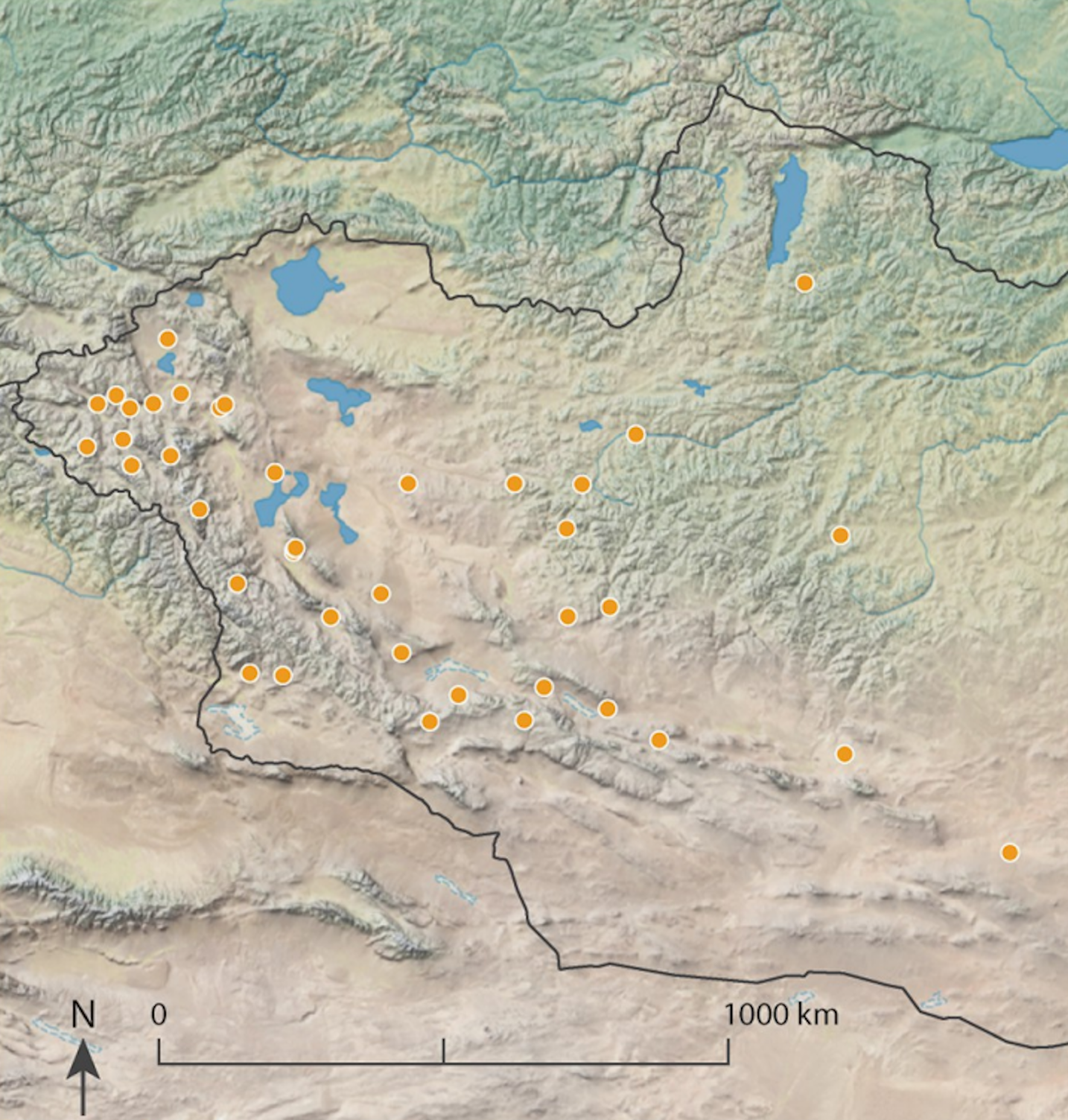
- Sagsai culture sites in Western Mongolia
- Geographical range: Mongolia
- Period: Bronze Age
- Dates: 1500 BCE — 1000 BCE
- Major sites: Minusinsk Basin
- Preceded by: Afanasievo culture Chemurchek culture Munkhkhairkhan culture
- Followed by: Deer stones culture Pazyryk culture Chandman culture

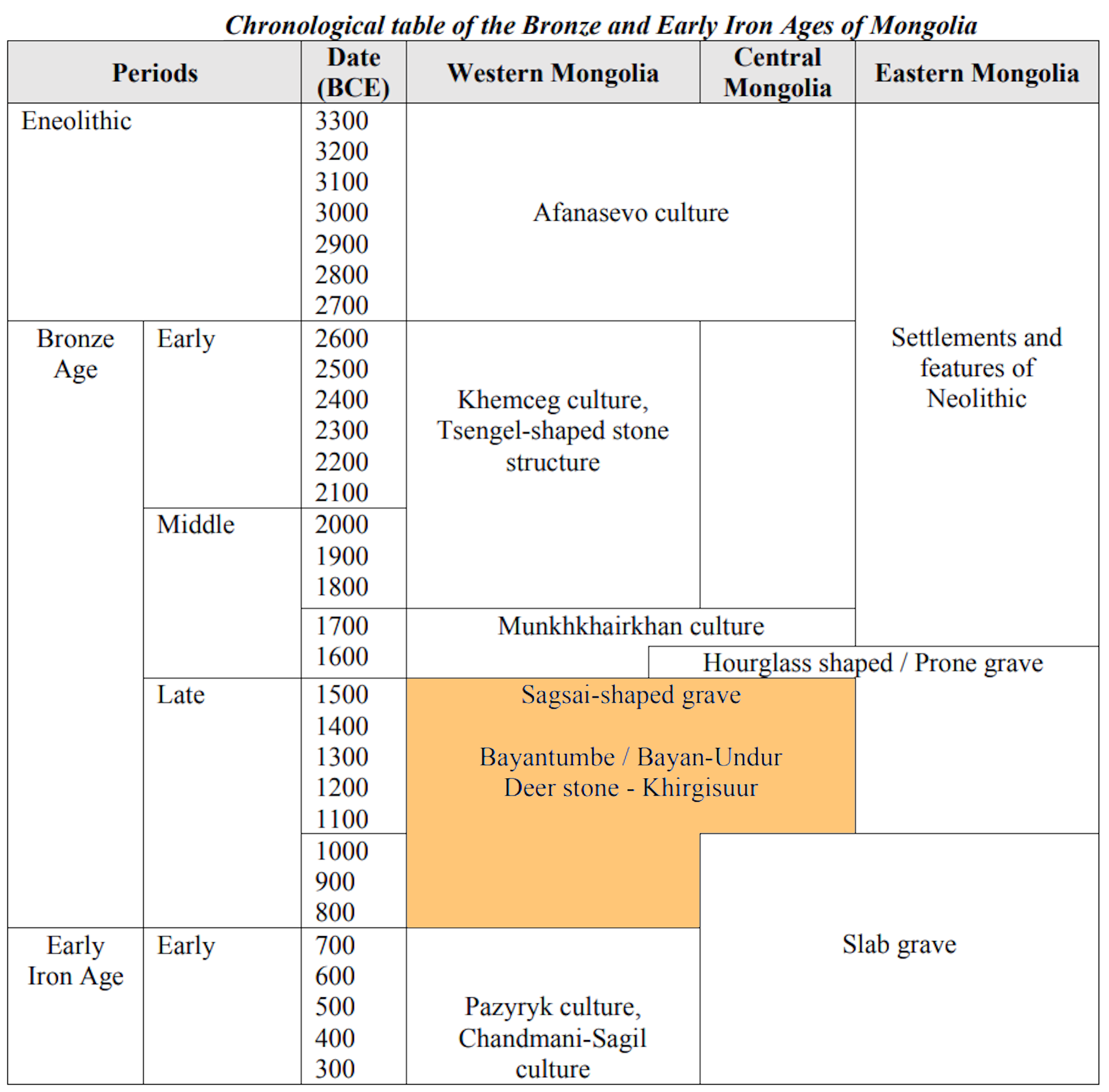
Chronological table of the Bronze and Early Iron Ages of Mongolia.

The Sagsai culture (1500-1000 BCE) is an early Bronze Age culture of Western Mongolia. It was centered on the Sagsai area (the westernmost region of modern Mongolia) and succeeded the Chemurchek culture.

The Sagsai culture had a pastoral lifestyle, raising sheep, cattle and horses. The oldest Sagsai sites are located in the Altai region, from where the Sagsai culture later expanded into western Mongolia.

The Sagsai culture is thought to have used horse chariots, prior to 1200 BCE, as shown by dated petroglyphs in the region. It was followed by the Deer stones culture.

At the same time the Ulaanzuukh-Tevsh culture was prospering in the steppes of southern and eastern Mongolia in the 13th century BCE, and seems to have transmitted the horsedrawn chariot to the Chinese Shang dynasty.

== Genetics ==
A 2014 study analyzed 13 Sagsai samples from 15-10th century BCE from the Altai mountains in Mongolia. Their genetic profile shows a contribution of about 65% from a European source, and 35% from East Asian one. The nine extracted Y-DNA belonged to the following haplogroups: Q-L54 (three samples), R1a-Z93 (four samples), Q-M242 and C-M130. The samples of mtDNA extracted belonged to haplogroups: H1, H7e, U4, T1a, D5a2, C4a1, D, D2, H1b, R1b1, A and H. Of the specimens yielding a pigmentation phenotype, 9% were predicted as blue eyed.

== Gallery ==
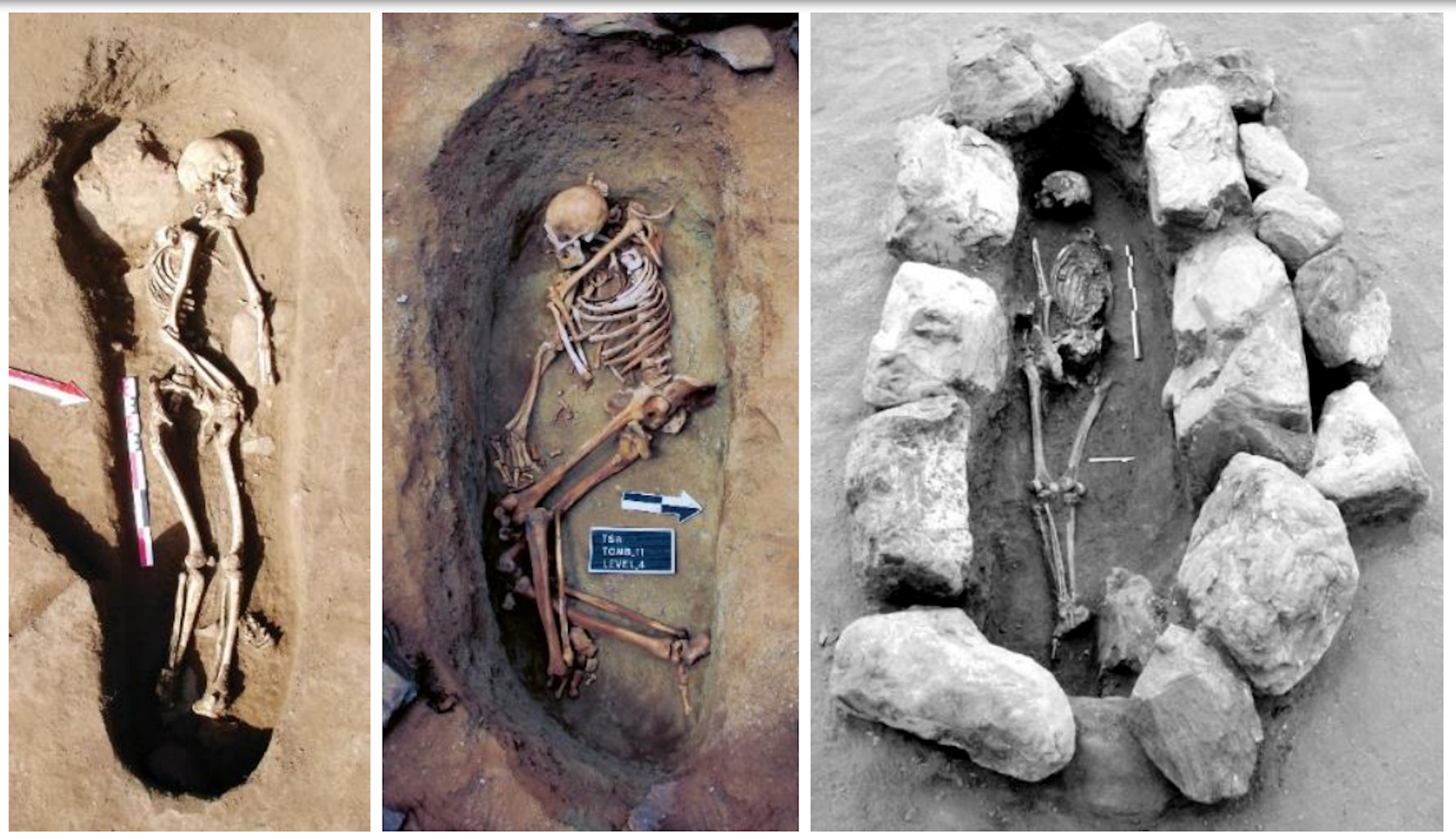
Sagsai-shaped graves, Mongolia.

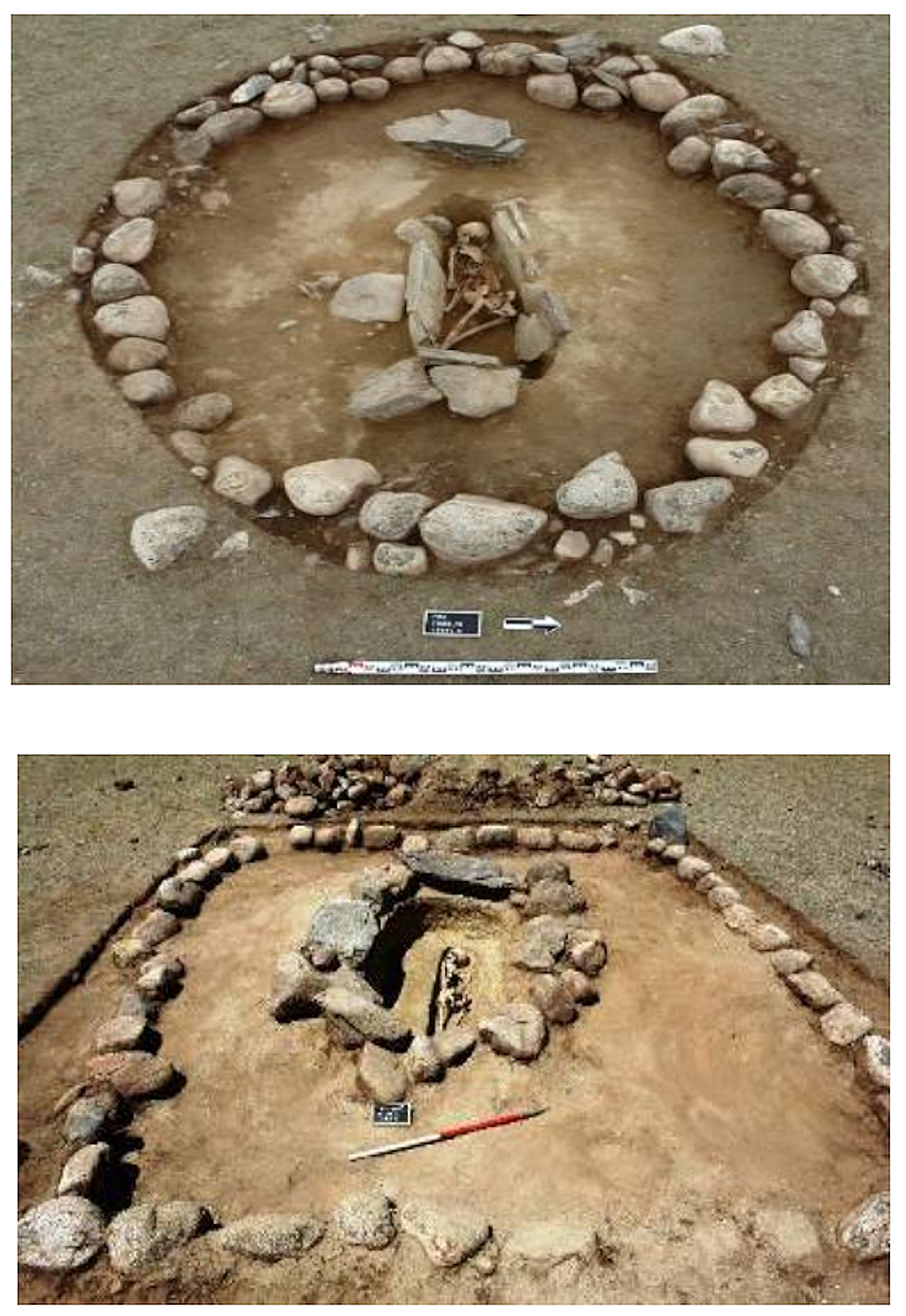
Sagsai-shaped graves, Mongolia.

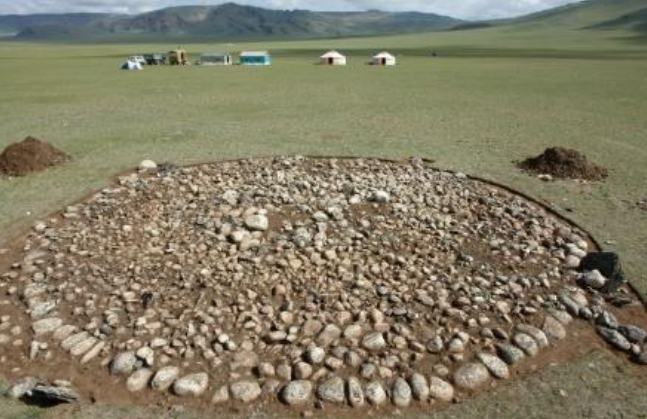
Sagsai-shaped graves, Tsagaan Asga site (round).

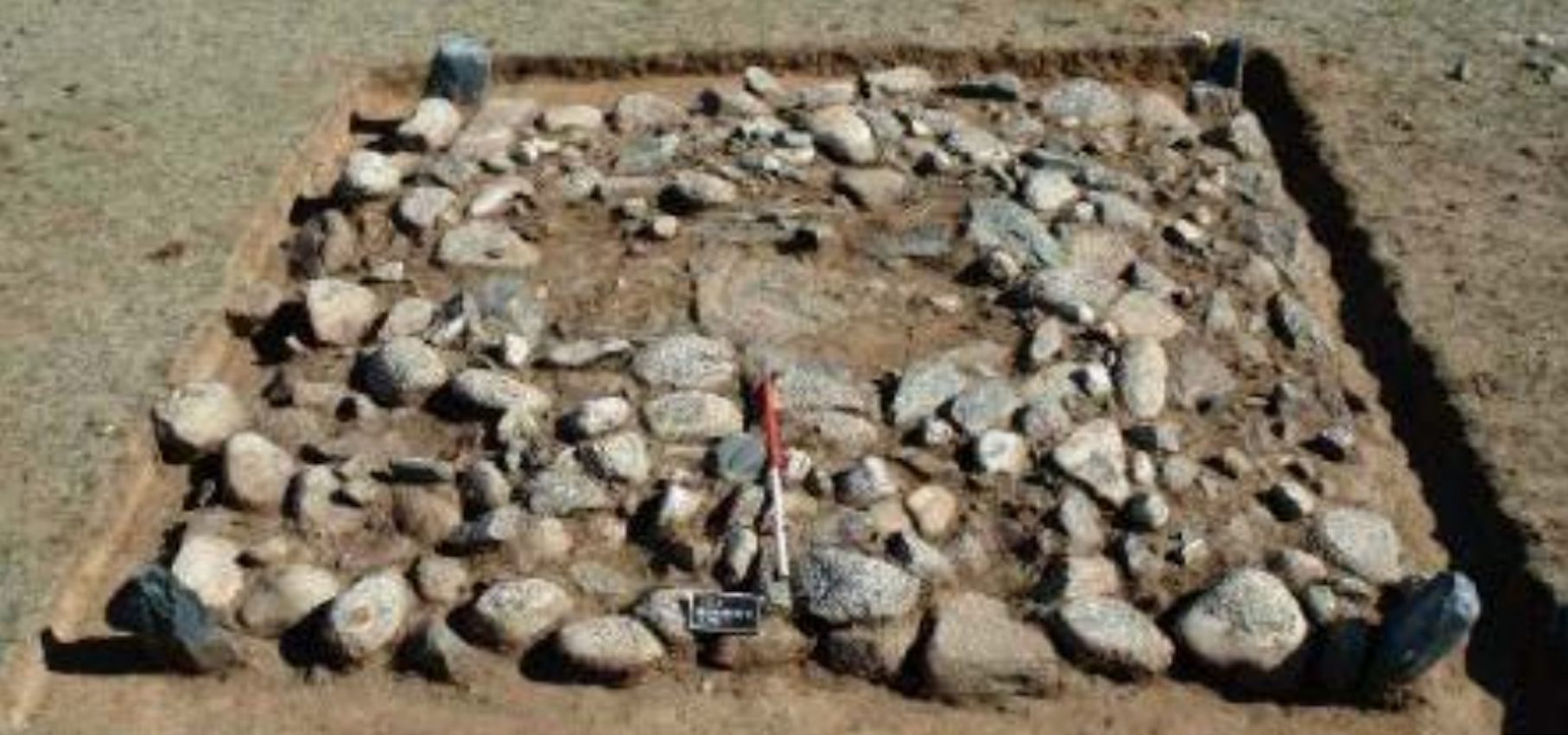
Sagsai-shaped graves, Tsagaan Asga site (square).

== Sources ==
- Esin, Yury (1 September 2021). "Chariots in the Bronze Age of Central Mongolia based on the materials from the Khoid Tamir river valley". Archaeological Research in Asia. 27 100304. doi:10.1016/j.ara.2021.100304. ISSN 2352-2267.
