= Chemurchek culture =

Archaeological site in western Mongolia

Coordinates: 46.128186°N 91.687306°E

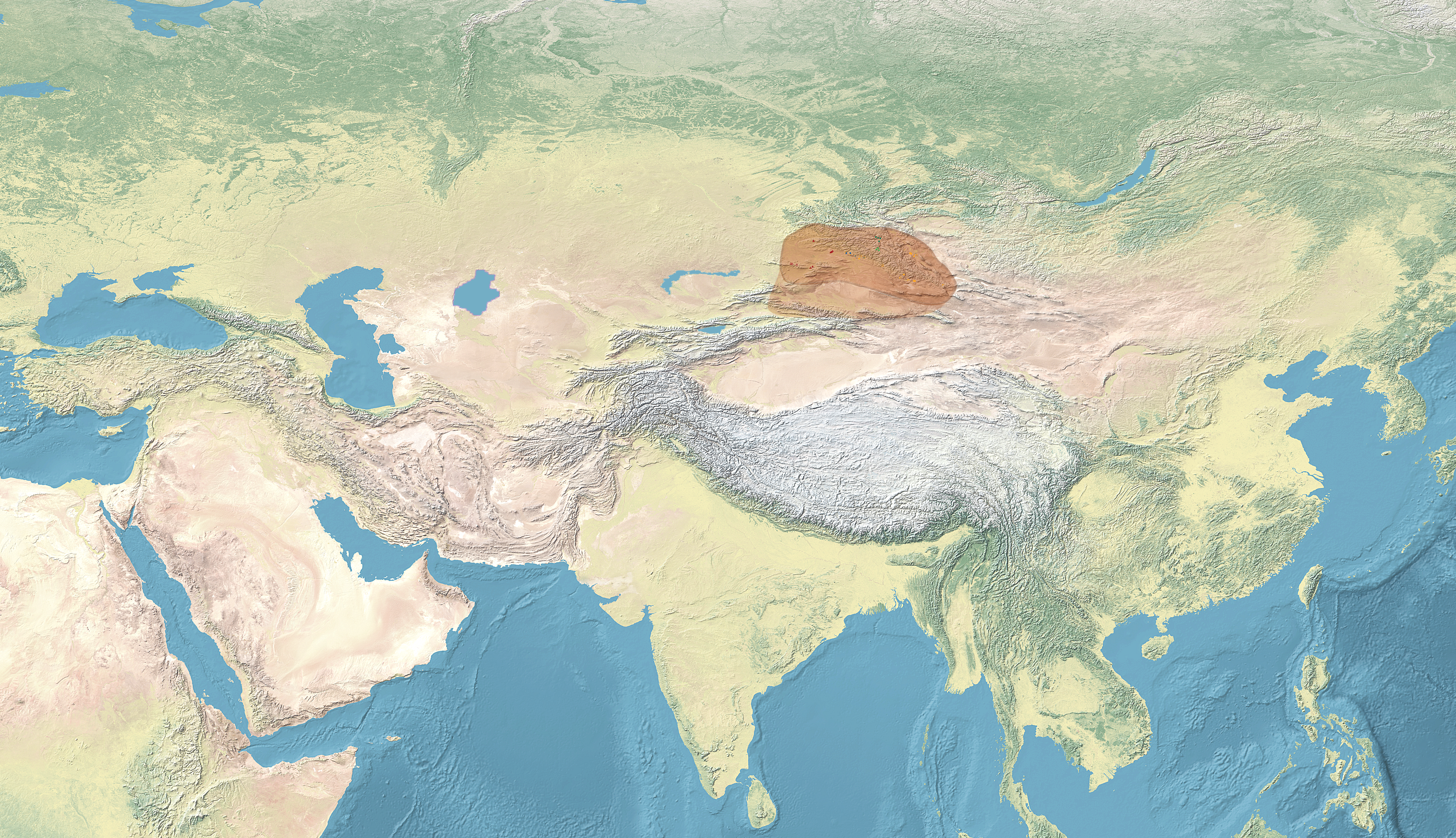
- Chemurchek culture and contemporary cultures and polities circa 2000 BCE. Chemurchek statues have also been found on the northern slopes of the eastern Tian Shan. : Location of the Chemurchek cemetery, near Altay City : Location of the Khukh uzuuriin dugui I - 1 statue.
- Geographical range: South Siberia
- Dates: 2750–1900 BCE
- Preceded by: Afanasievo culture
- Followed by: Munkhkhairkhan culture Sagsai culture Deer stones culture Subeshi culture

The Chemurchek culture (Ch:切木尔切克, Qièmùěrqièkè; Ru: Чемурчекская культура), also called Khemtseg, Hemtseg, Qiemu’erqieke, Shamirshak (2750–1900 BCE), is a Bronze Age archaeological culture of western Mongolia and the borders of neighbouring countries, such as the Dzungarian Basin of Xinjiang and eastern Kazakhstan. It immediately follows the Afanasievo culture, and is contemporary with the early Tarim Mummies to the south and the Okunev culture to the north. The Chemurchek burials are characterized by large rectangular stone fences, built around collective tombs. The mortuary position of the deceased (supine position with flexed legs) is similar to that of the Afanasievo culture, but the Chemurchek culture is considered distinct. The name "Chemurchek culture" is derived from the Chemurchek cemetery in Altay City, Xinjiang, China. Chemurchek sites have been identified from western Mongolia to areas as far west as the Ili valley in Kazakhstan and western China.

== Characteristics ==
Anthropomorphic standing stones were erected next to the tombs, on their eastern side. Their faces are flattened with a straight nose and globular eyes. They appear to be naked as pectoral muscles seem to be depicted. They far predate and are very different from Turkic balbal statues found in the same general area but dated to the 7th to 10th centuries CE. They are highly similar to Western European anthropomorphic stelae, suggesting the transfer of cultural characteristics through migration. A more developed tradition of anthropomorphic stelae existed in the contemporary Okunev culture to the north, in the Minusinsk basin (c. 2550/2500 – c. 1900/1700 BCE).

Artifacts such as stone bowls, bone tools, ceramics (grey wares with sophisticated patterns of incised decoration), and metal jewelry have been recovered from the tombs. Bronze artifacts have also been found. Bronze tools include knives, awls, spearheads and arrowheads. Bronze was cast in open or composite stone molds, and seems to have been a focus of economic production.

Dental analysis has shown that the Chemurchek culture consumed ruminant dairy products.

In the Altai Mountains and to the southeast, Afanasievans seem to have coexisted with the early period of the Chemurchek culture for some time, as some of their burials are contemporary and some of the artifacts of the burials coincide. The Chemurchek culture had various characteristics of West European origin.

Another Chemurcheck burial site was discovered in Yagshiin khuduu in Bulgan soum, Khovd aimag, which contained "the oldest kurgan stelae" discovered in Mongolia, dated to c. 2500–2000 BCE.

== European connection hypothesis ==
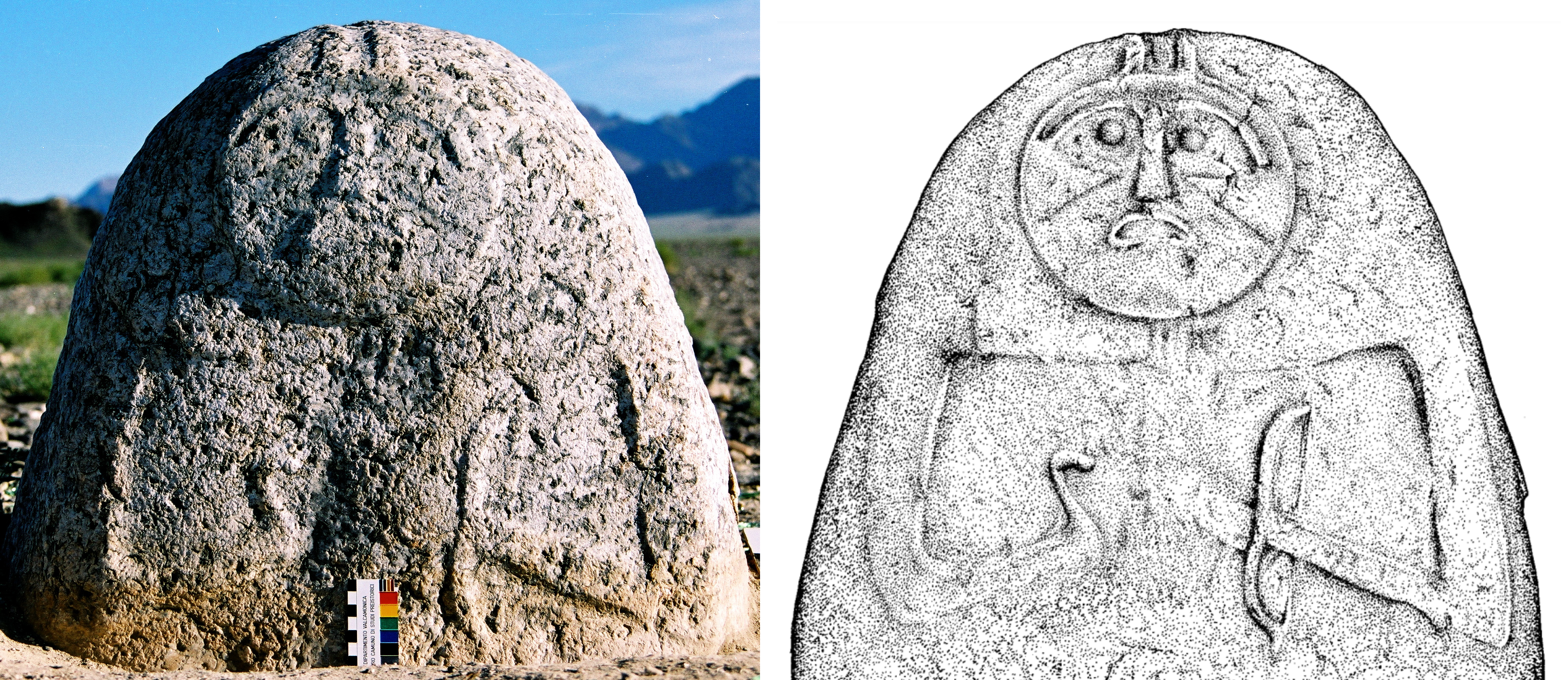
Chemurchek burial standing stone (Yagshiin khodoo 3).

Archaeologist Alexey Kovalev has remarked on the similarities between the material and tomb cultures of the Chemurcheks and those of Southern France, leading him to suggest a migratory origin for the Chemurchek culture from Western Europe and more specifically southern France.

The Chemurchek statues have a lot in common with southern France statues of the late 4th millennium such as "La Dame de Saint-Sernin" or the "Statue-menhir de Maison-Aube". Kovalev further suggests that the Chemurchek culture may be associated with Proto-Tokharians, who must have migrated to the east around this period, and whose Western Indo-European language is closest to proto-Germanic and proto-Italian, corresponding to the broad geographical area encompassing southern France. The language of the Chemurchek/Proto-Tocharians may have originated from the same general location in Western Europe, as did their burial and statuary styles. According to Alexey Kovalev:

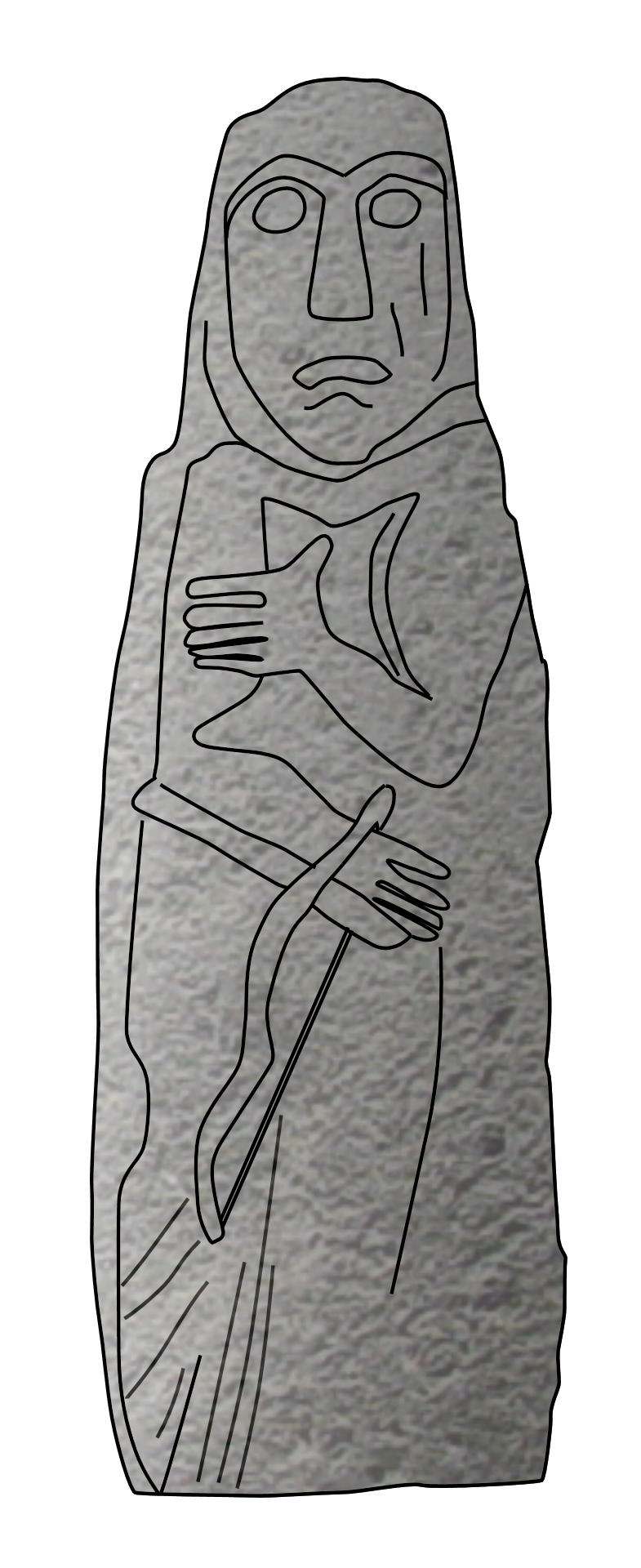
Chemurchek statue, Khukh uzuuriin dugui I - 1. Bulgan, Khovd, Mongolia.

Taken together, the architecture of burial constructions, the tradition of collective burials in crypts, the form and ornamentation of vessels, the style of stone statues, the paintings on walls of burialchambers, the slate plaques and images of importantdeities reveal a strong analogy with materials of the Middle-Final Neolithic period of Western Europe. The complex of specific attributes that appeared in Dzhungaria from c. 2700–2600 BCE is very close to those found at Final Neolithic sites in southern France, the Jura Mountains, and western Switzerland c. 3200–2600 BCE. The transfer of such a complex set of cultural traditions such a great distance seems impossible without the migration of ancient people.

— Alexey Kovalev, The Chemurchek (Qie'muerqieke) cultural phenomenon

In particular, regarding the architecture of the tombs: "the unique architectural technique of constructing perimeter embankments lined with stone facades was used before the appearance of the Chemurchek monuments only during the construction of megalithic tombs of France and the British Isles". Three main types of Chemurchek tombs are recorded: the Alkabek, Bulgan and Kermuqi types.

A 2021 study conducted by Wang and others found that the remains of the Chemurchek culture were not related to ancient populations of Western Europe, showing that the long-distance transfer of megalithic cultural traditions must have occurred without the migration of peoples.

== Genetics ==
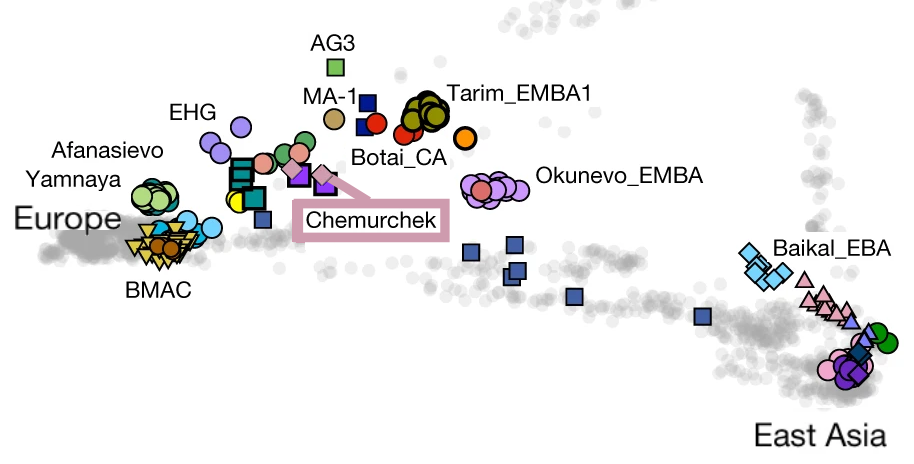
Genetic proximity of Chemurchek culture remains ( ), with ancient (color) and modern (grey) populations. Primary Component Analysis (detail).

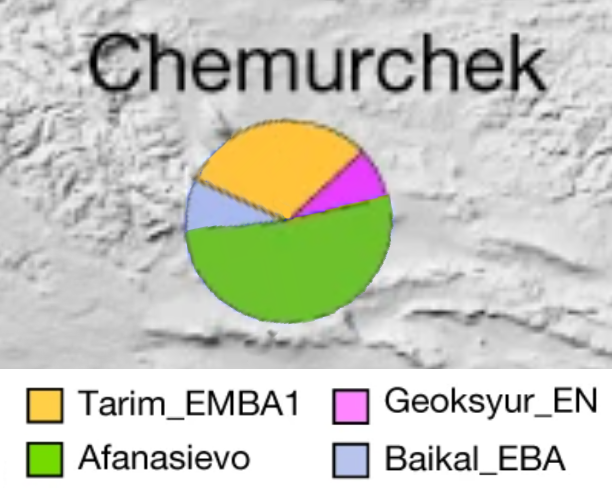
Chemurchek genetic profile.

The people of the Chemurchek culture were apparently descendants of Afanasievo populations intermixed with local populations. Their genetic profile shows a contribution of about 50% from the Afanasievans, combined with about 30% of Ancient North Eurasian (an ancient Siberian substrate represented by the Tarim mummies of sample Tarim_EMBA1), and small proportions of Ancient Northeast Asian (Baikal_EBA) and BMAC (Geoksyur_EN).

In a genetic study published in Science in February 2021, two remains from the Chemurchek culture buried in western Mongolia were examined. The two individuals were found to harbor a fairly balanced mixed ancestry between local Mongolian hunter-gatherers and Fatyanovo-associated groups. The male samples belonged to Y-dna haplogroup R1b1a1a2a2-Z2103, in line with their direct genetic continuity with Afanasievo and Yamnaya cultures. The samples of mtDNA extracted belonged to maternal haplogroups T1a1 and C4+152.

== Gallery ==
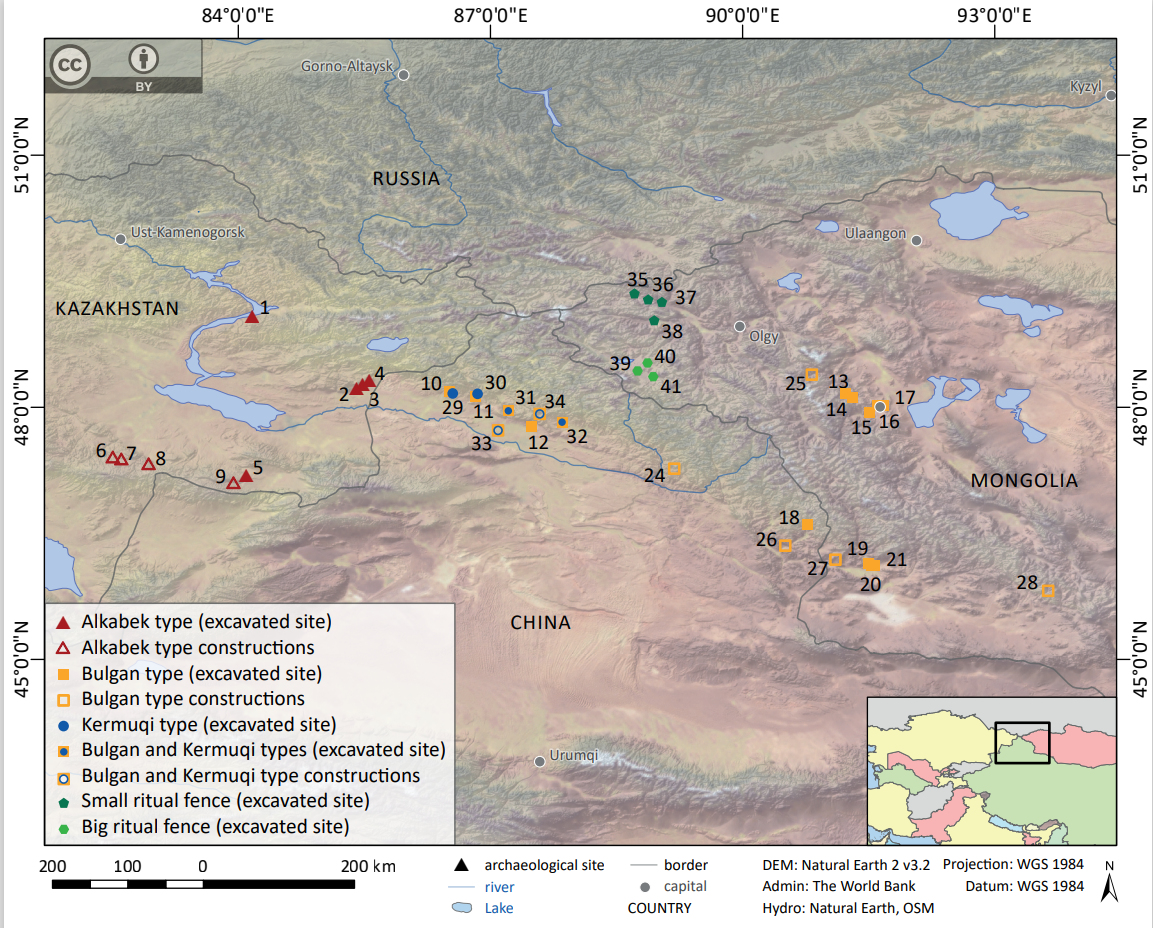
Chemurchek funerary and ritual structures

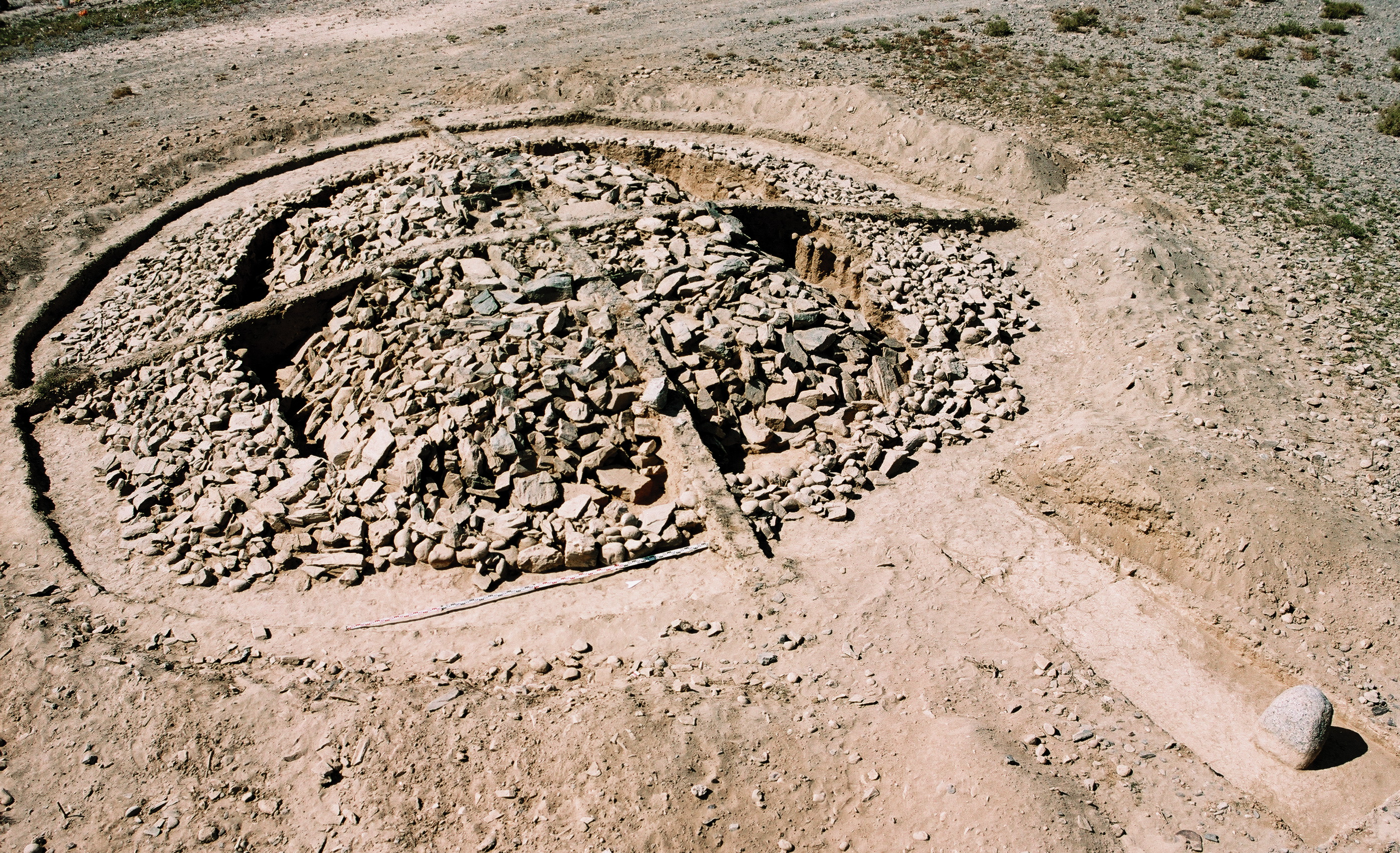
Chemurchek barrow with statue-menhir (Yagshiin khodoo 3), "Bulgan type" mound.

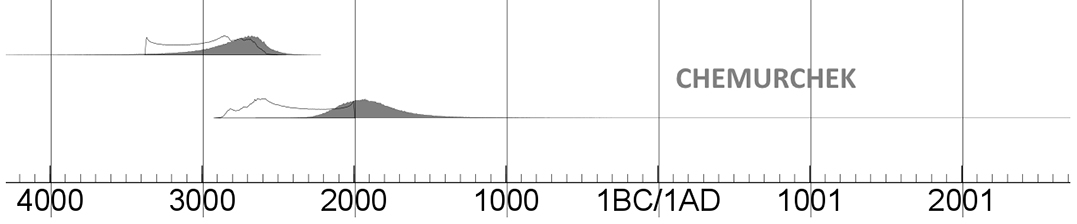
Chemurchek burials, carbon dates

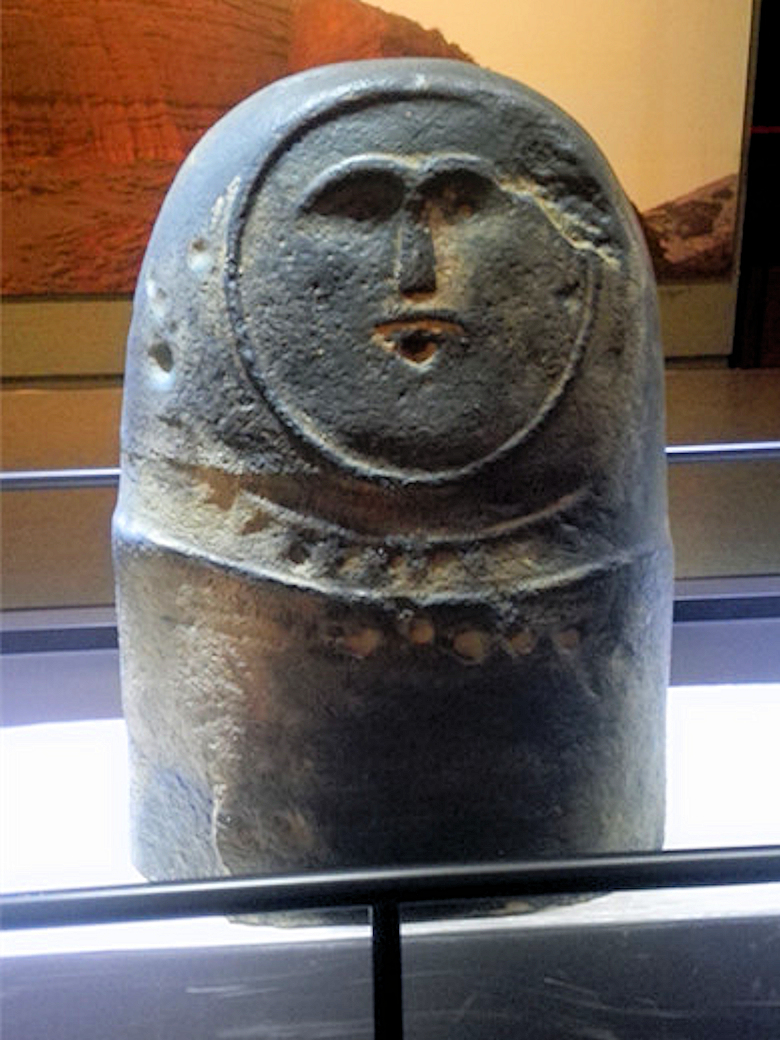
Funerary statue from Chemurchek cemetery (Burial mound M2). Xinjiang Uighur Autonomous Region Museum.

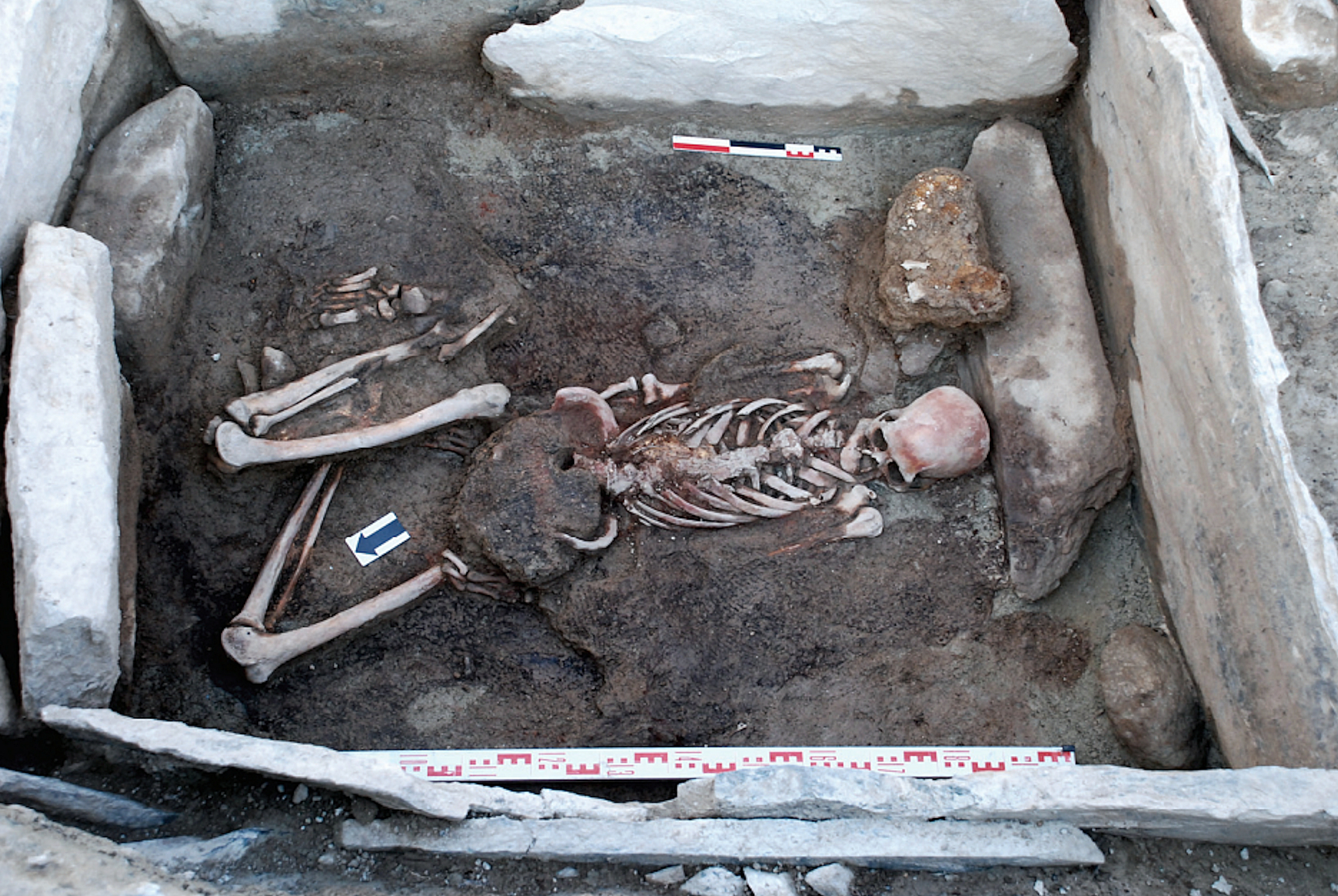
Chemurchek sanctuary Hulagash (Bayan-Ulgii aimag, Mongolia) Burial, c. 2500 BCE

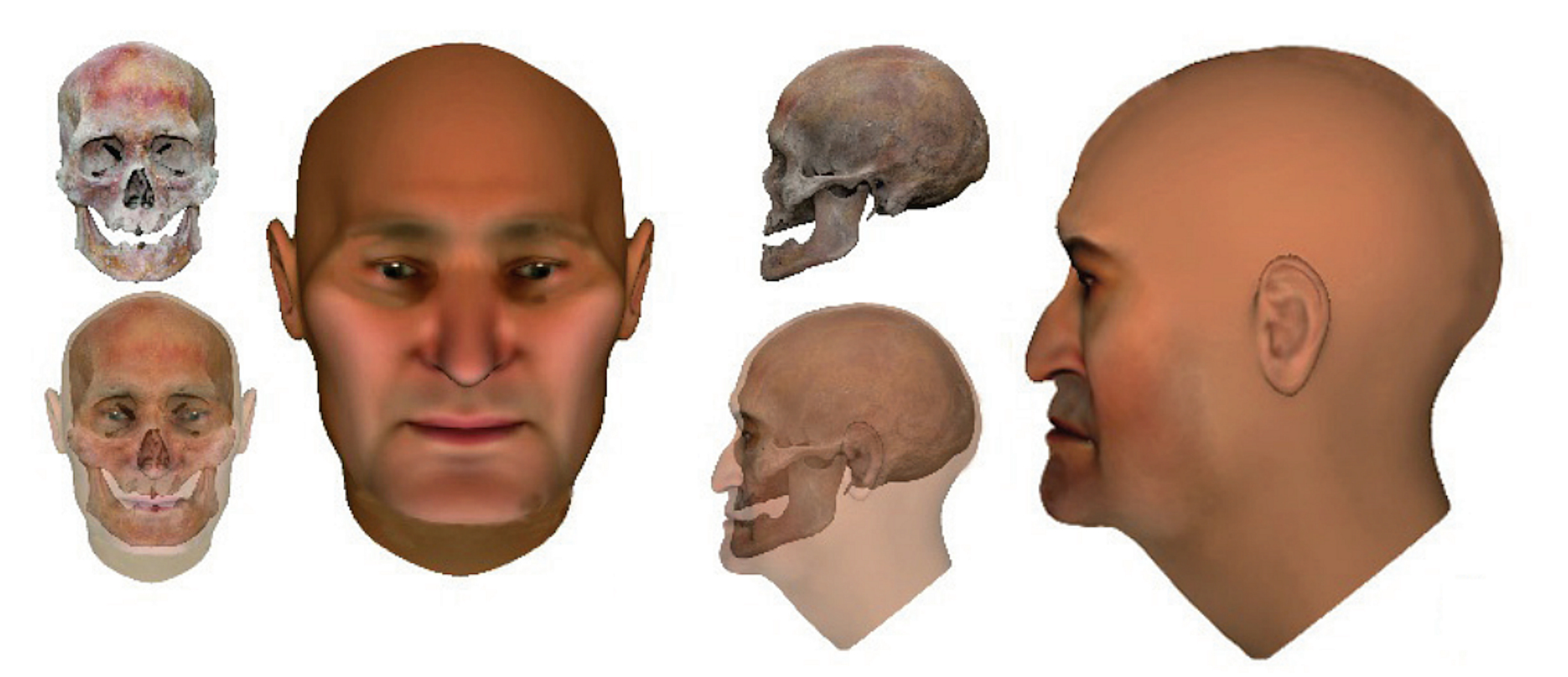
Chemurchek sanctuary Hulagash (Bayan-Ulgii aimag, Mongolia) Burial, forensic reconstruction of the skull, c. 2500 BCE

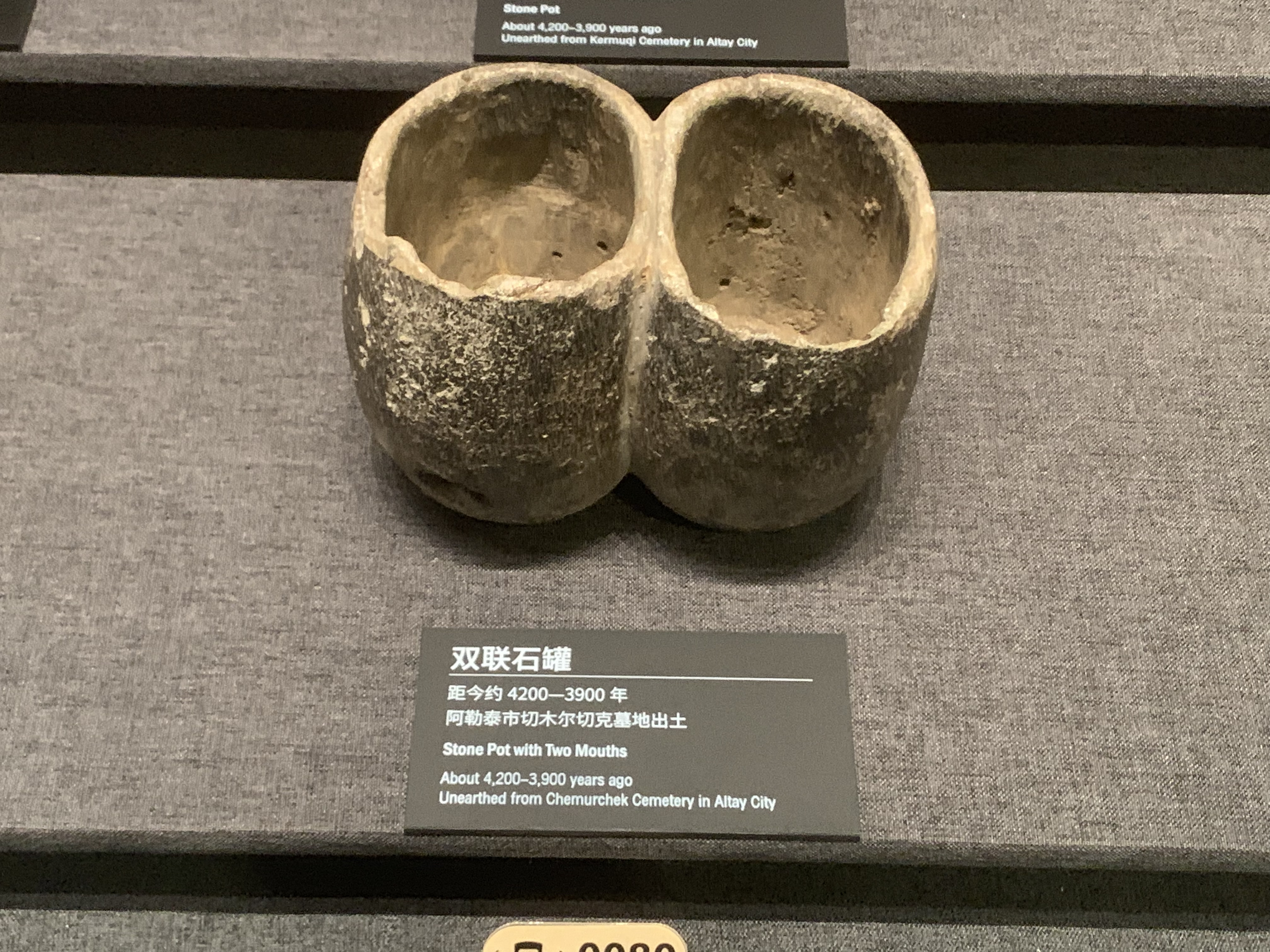
Stone pot with two mouths, 4200–3900 BCE, Chemurcheck cemetery, Altay City.

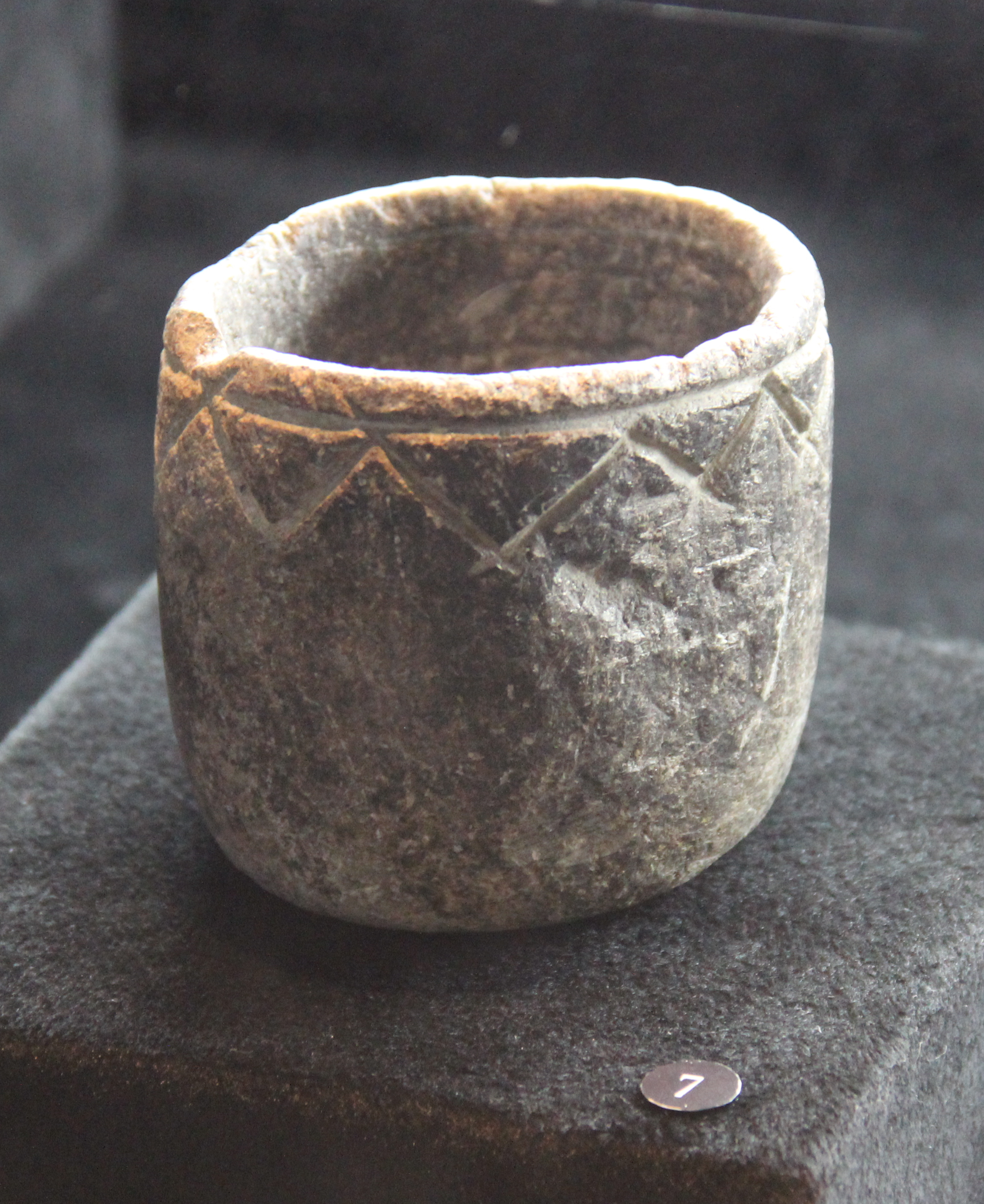
Stone ware, Yagshiin khuduu in Bulgan soum, Khovd aimag. National Museum of Mongolia

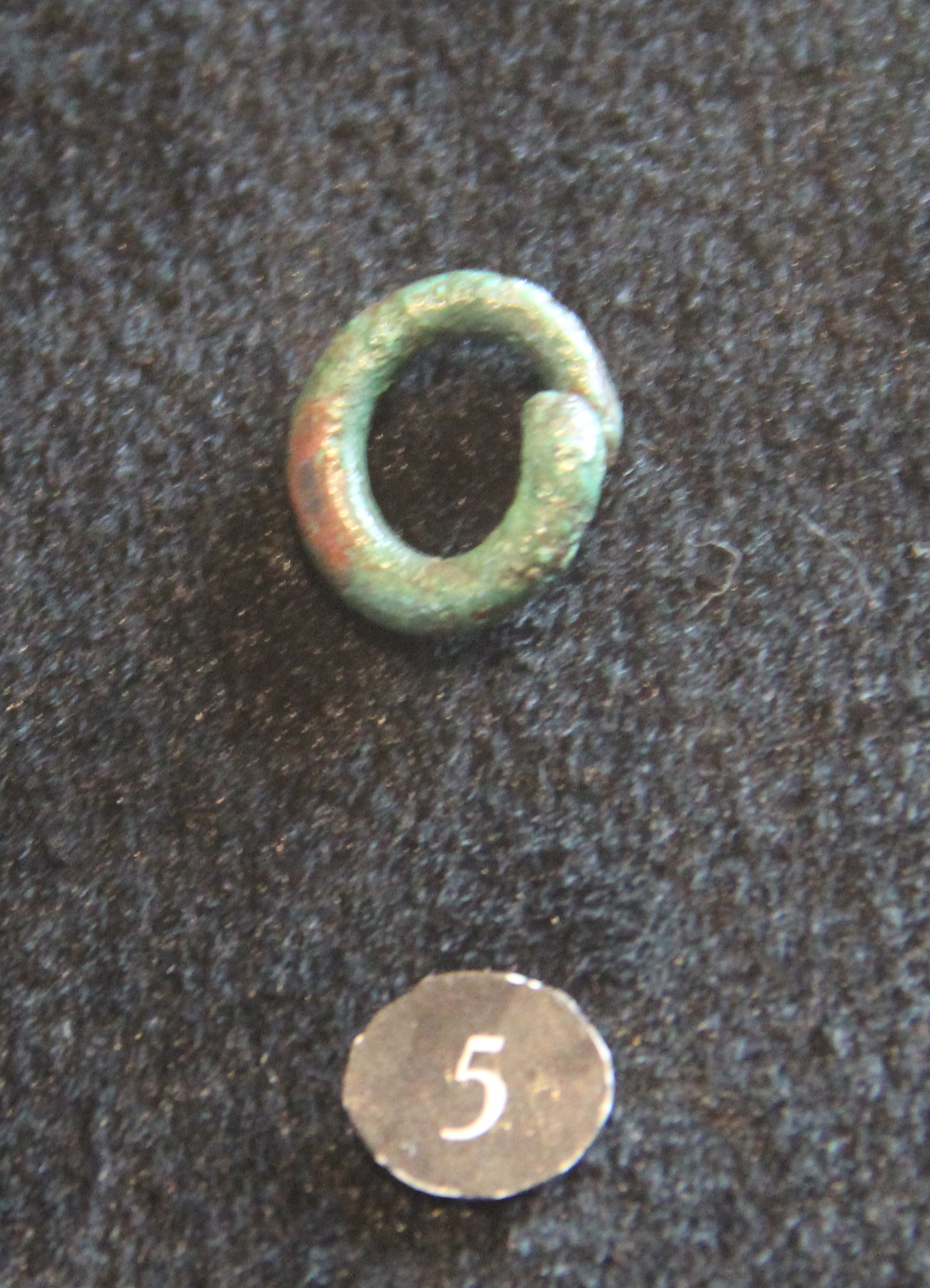
Bronze earring, Yagshiin khuduu in Bulgan soum, Khovd aimag. National Museum of Mongolia

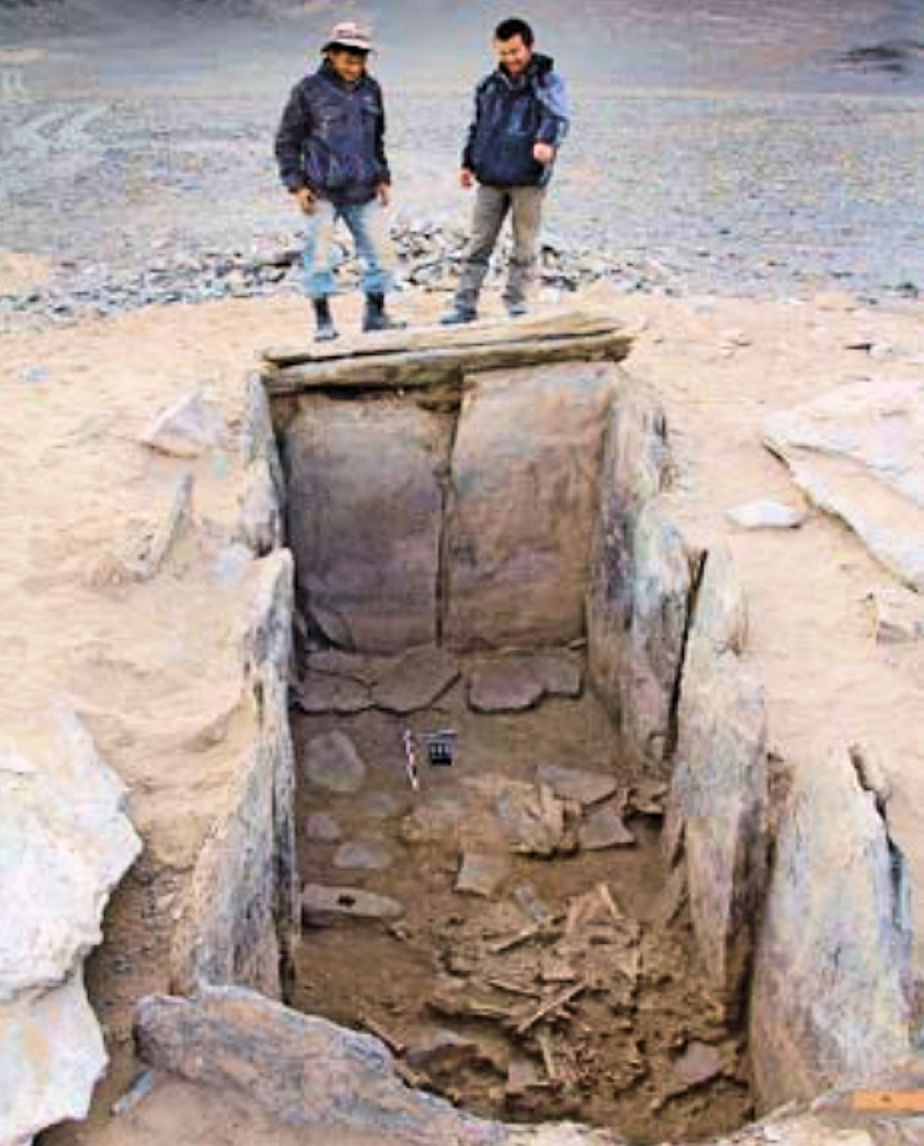
Stone fence and burial of Khemtseg culture, Avyn Khukh Uul, Bulgan, Khovd, Mongolia

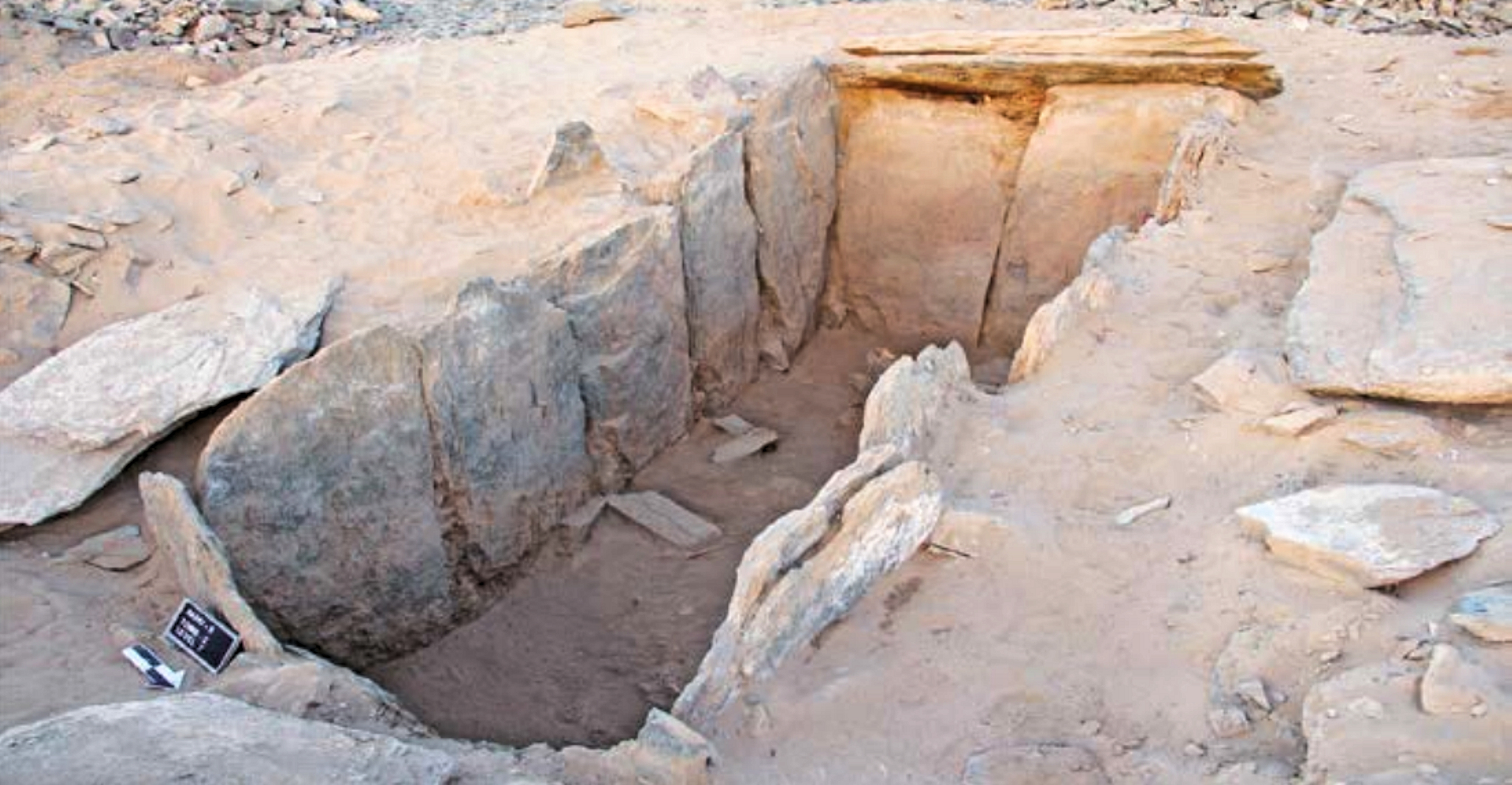
Stone fence and burial of Khemtseg culture, Avyn Khukh Uul, Bulgan, Khovd, Mongolia

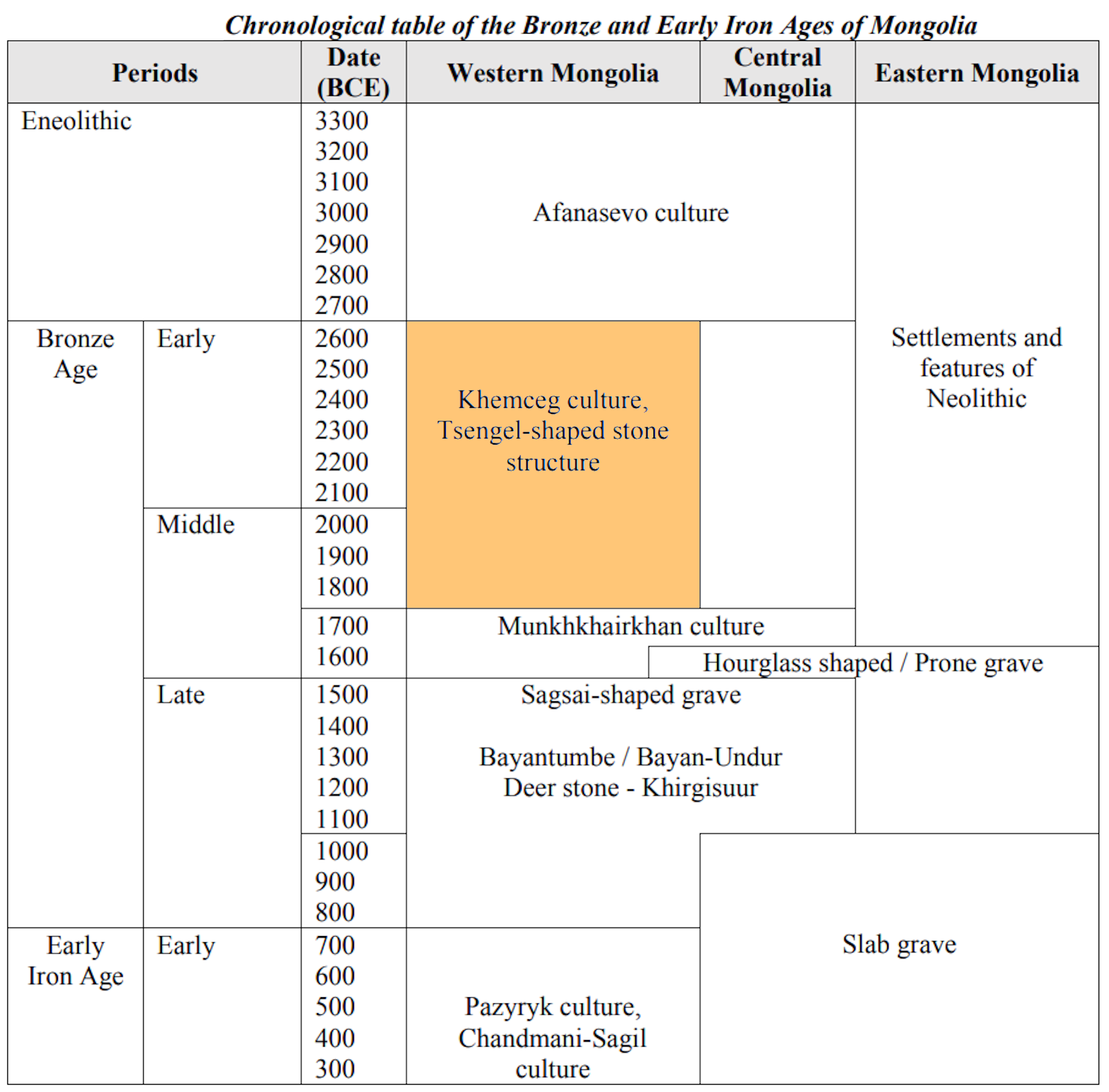
Chronological table of the Bronze and Early Iron Ages of Mongolia.<ref

== Sources ==
- Betts, A.; Jia, P.; Abuduresule, I. (1 March 2019). "A new hypothesis for early Bronze Age cultural diversity in Xinjiang, China". Archaeological Research in Asia. 17: 204–213. doi:10.1016/j.ara.2018.04.001. ISSN 2352-2267.
- Jeong, Choongwon; Wang, Ke; Wilkin, Shevan; Taylor, William Timothy Treal; Miller, Bryan K.; Bemmann, Jan H.; Stahl, Raphaela; Chiovelli, Chelsea; Knolle, Florian; Ulziibayar, Sodnom; Khatanbaatar, Dorjpurev; Erdenebaatar, Diimaajav; Erdenebat, Ulambayar; Ochir, Ayudai; Ankhsanaa, Ganbold; Vanchigdash, Chuluunkhuu; Ochir, Battuga; Munkhbayar, Chuluunbat; Tumen, Dashzeveg; Kovalev, Alexey; Kradin, Nikolay; Bazarov, Bilikto A.; Miyagashev, Denis A.; Konovalov, Prokopiy B.; Zhambaltarova, Elena; Miller, Alicia Ventresca; Haak, Wolfgang; Schiffels, Stephan; Krause, Johannes; Boivin, Nicole; Erdene, Myagmar; Hendy, Jessica; Warinner, Christina (12 November 2020). "A Dynamic 6,000-Year Genetic History of Eurasia's Eastern Steppe". Cell. 183 (4): 890–904. doi:10.1016/j.cell.2020.10.015. ISSN 0092-8674. PMC 7664836. PMID 33157037. S2CID 214725595.
- Kovalev, Alexey (2011). "The Great Migration of the Chemurchek People from France to the Altai in the Early 3rd Millenium BCE". International Journal of Eurasian Studies. 1: 1–58.
- Kovalev, Alexey (2012). Ancient statue-menhirs in Chemurchek and surrounding territories 2012 (Древнейшие статуи Чемурчека и окружающих территорий 2012) (Naučn. izd ed.). Sankt-Peterburg: LDPrint. ISBN 978-5-905585-03-6.
- Kovalev, Alexey (2022). "Megalithic traditions in the Early Bronze Age of the Mongolian Altai: the Chemurchek (Qie'muerqieke) cultural phenomenon". Megaliths of the World Vol. 2. Oxford Archaeopress.
- Zhang, Fan; Ning, Chao; Scott, Ashley; Fu, Qiaomei; Bjørn, Rasmus; Li, Wenying; Wei, Dong; Wang, Wenjun; Fan, Linyuan; Abuduresule, Idilisi; Hu, Xingjun; Ruan, Qiurong; Niyazi, Alipujiang; Dong, Guanghui; Cao, Peng; Liu, Feng; Dai, Qingyan; Feng, Xiaotian; Yang, Ruowei; Tang, Zihua; Ma, Pengcheng; Li, Chunxiang; Gao, Shizhu; Xu, Yang; Wu, Sihao; Wen, Shaoqing; Zhu, Hong; Zhou, Hui; Robbeets, Martine; Kumar, Vikas; Krause, Johannes; Warinner, Christina; Jeong, Choongwon; Cui, Yinqiu (November 2021). "The genomic origins of the Bronze Age Tarim Basin mummies". Nature. 599 (7884): 256–261. Bibcode:2021Natur.599..256Z. doi:10.1038/s41586-021-04052-7. ISSN 1476-4687. PMC 8580821. PMID 34707286. S2CID 240072904.
