= Karasuk culture =

Archaeological culture

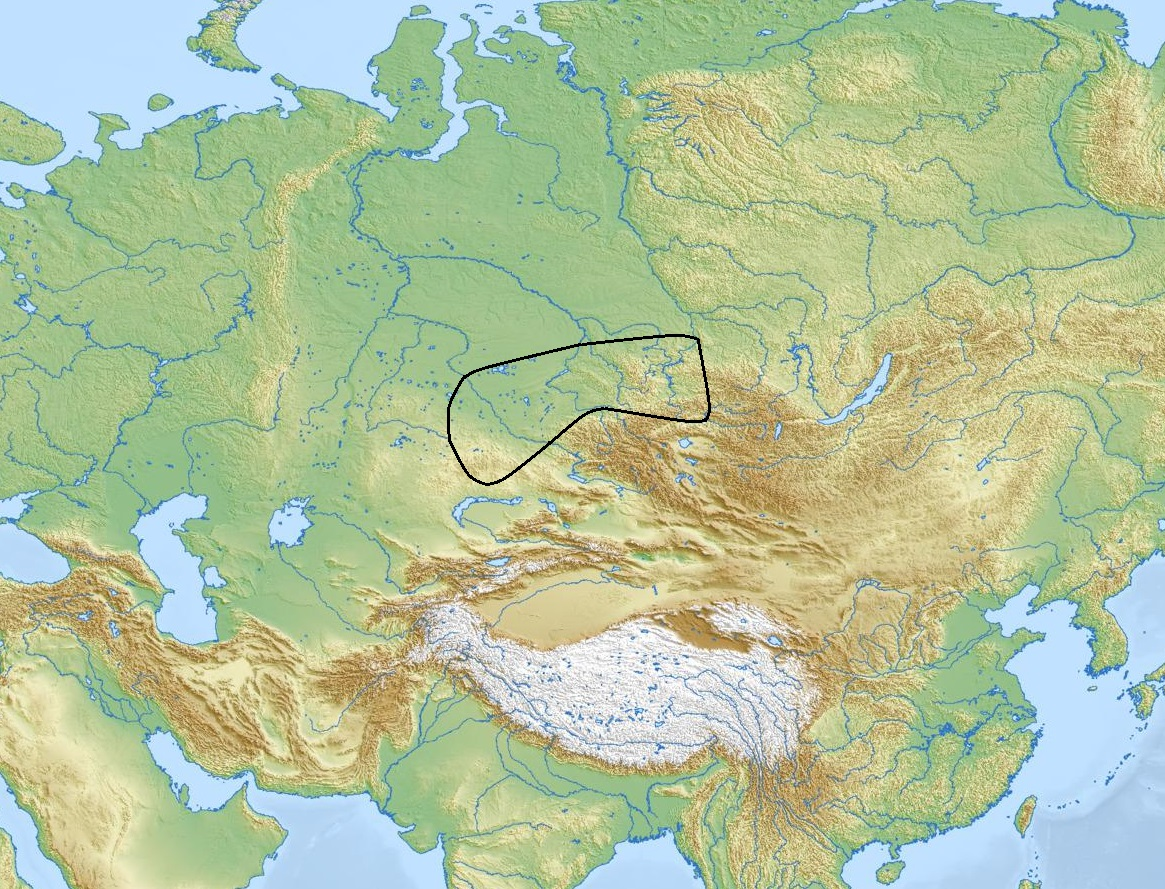
- Continental Asia in 1000 BCE Area of the Karasuk culture.
- Geographical range: South Central Siberia
- Period: Bronze Age
- Dates: ca. 1500–800 BC
- Preceded by: Andronovo culture, Seima-Turbino phenomenon, Afanasievo culture, Okunev culture, Karakol culture
- Followed by: Arzhan culture, Pazyryk culture, Tagar culture, Irmen culture

The Karasuk culture (Russian: Карасукская культура, romanized: Karasukskaya kul'tura) describes a group of late Bronze Age societies who ranged from the Aral Sea to the upper Yenisei in the east and south to the Altai Mountains and the Tian Shan in ca. 1500–800 BC.

== Overview ==
The distribution of the Karasuk culture covers the eastern parts of the Andronovo culture, which it appears to replace. It is considered that the Karasuk culture primarily formed out of the Andronovo culture with influences from the Okunevo culture.

The remains of settlements are minimal, and entirely of the mortuary variety. At least 2000 burials are known. The Karasuk period persisted down to c. 700 BC. From c. 700 to c. 200 BC, culture developed along similar lines. Vital trade contact is traced from northern China and the Baikal region to the Black Sea and the Urals, influencing the uniformity of the culture. The Karasuk was succeeded by the Tagar culture.

The economy was mixed agriculture and stockbreeding. Its culture appears to have been more mobile than the Andronovo. The Karasuk were farmers who practiced metallurgy on a large scale. Arsenical bronze artefacts are present. Their settlements were of pit houses and they buried their dead in stone cists covered by kurgans and surrounded by square stone enclosures. Industrially, they were skilled metalworkers, the diagnostic artifacts of the culture being a bronze knife with curving profiles and a decorated handle and horse bridles. The pottery has been compared to that discovered in Inner Mongolia and the interior of China, with burials bronze knives similar to those from northeastern China. Their realistic animal art probably contributed to the development of the Scytho-Siberian animal art style (Scythian art).

The origins of the Karasuk culture are complex, but it is generally accepted that its origins lie both with the Andronovo culture and local cultures of the Yenisei. The ethnic identity of the Karasuk is problematic, as the Andronovo culture has been associated with the Indo-Iranians while the local cultures have been considered as unconnected to the steppe. Nevertheless, a specifically Proto-Iranian identity has been proposed for the Karasuk culture. The Karasuk tribes have been described by archaeologists as exhibiting pronounced physical features similar to European and other West Eurasian populations, described in anthropological studies from 1999-2006 as "Europoid" or "Caucasoid" features. George van Driem has suggested a connection with the Yeniseian and Burushaski people, proposing a Karasuk languages group.

The contemporary Deer stones culture to the southeast may have been built in part by nomads from the Karasuk culture.

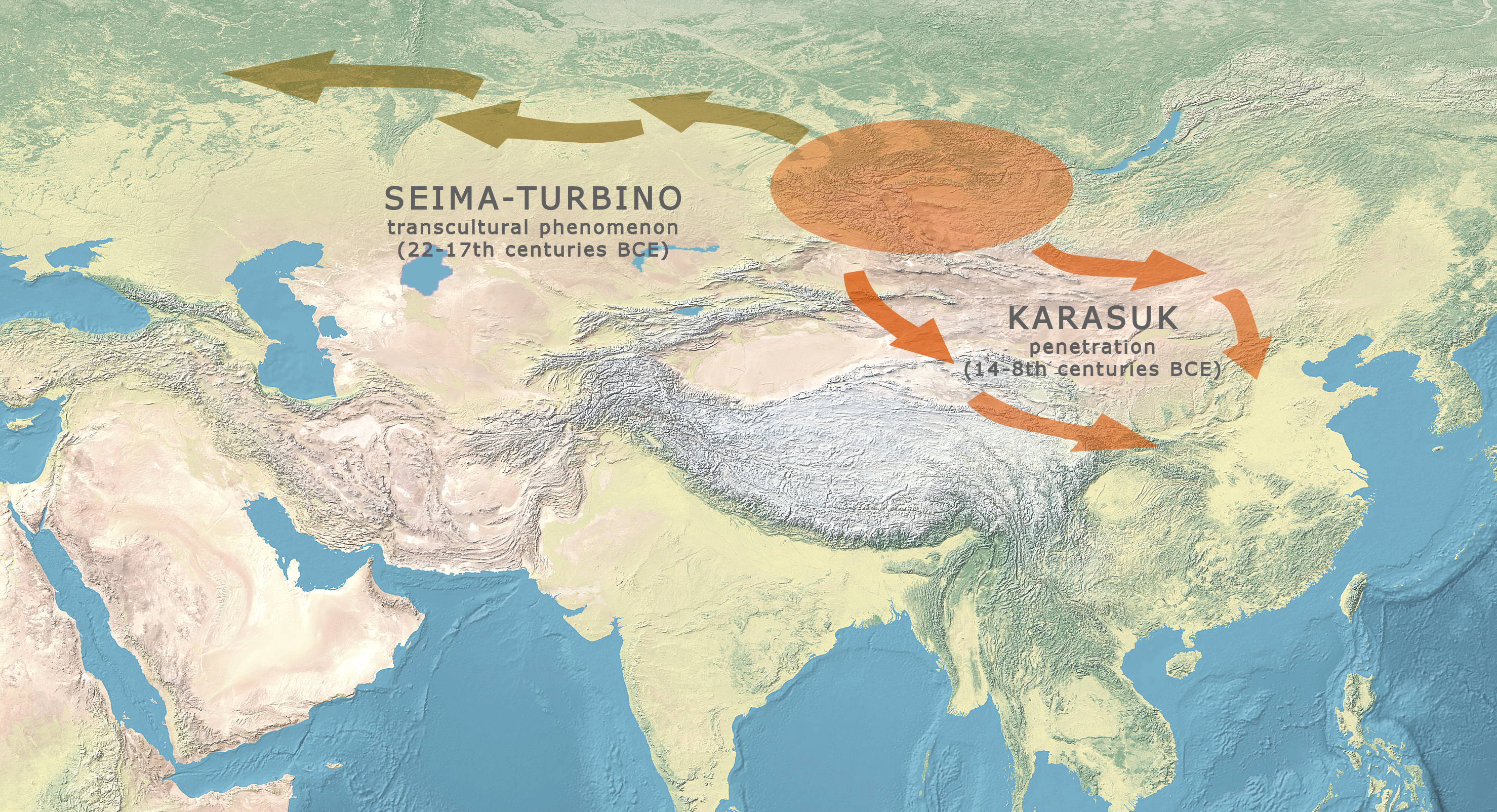
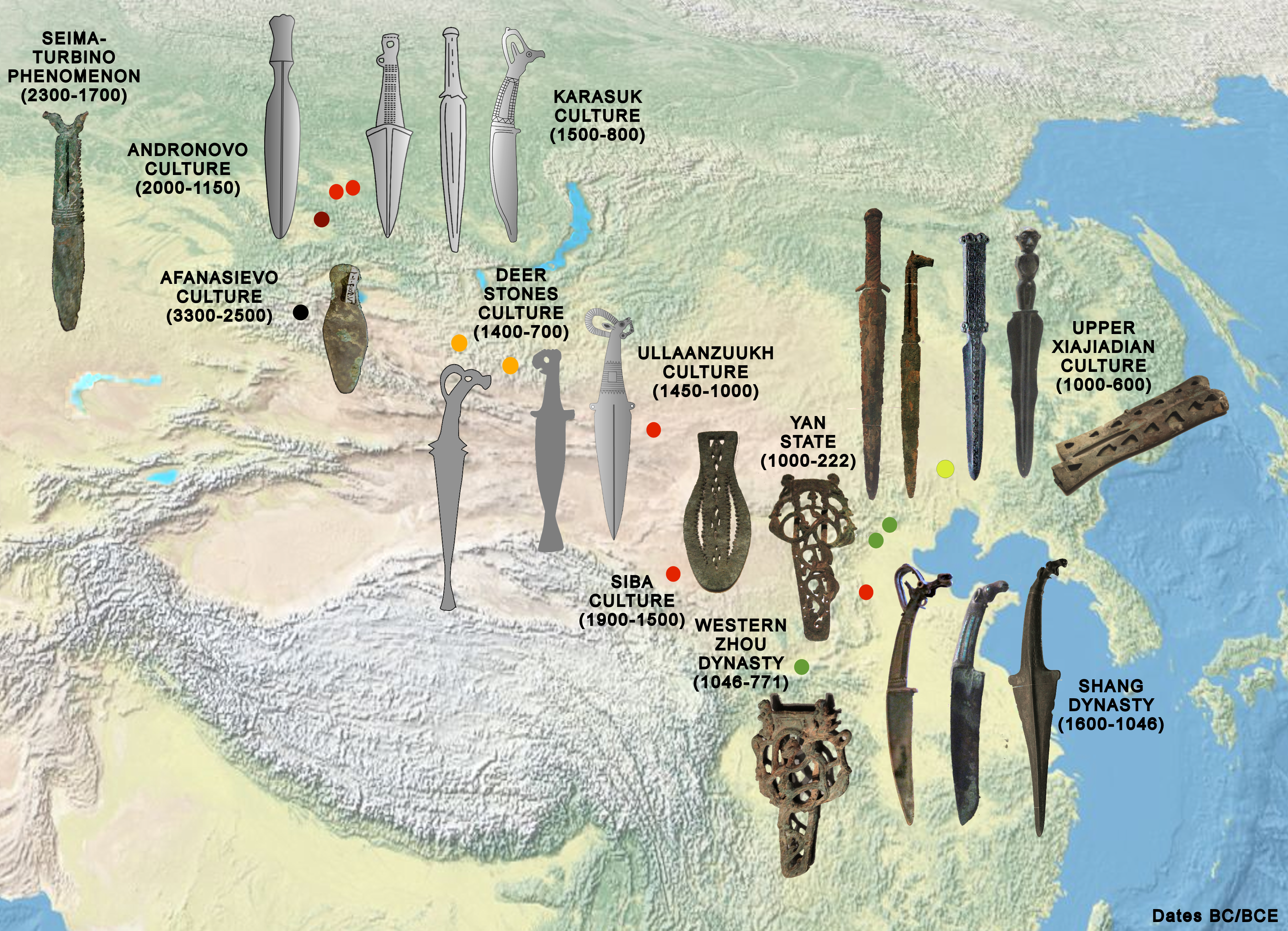
Karasuk culture diffusion, (Note: Chernykh 2008, p. 91, fig.18) and distribution of small swords or daggers along the arc between the eastern steppe and China (3300-700 BCE).

== Chariots ==
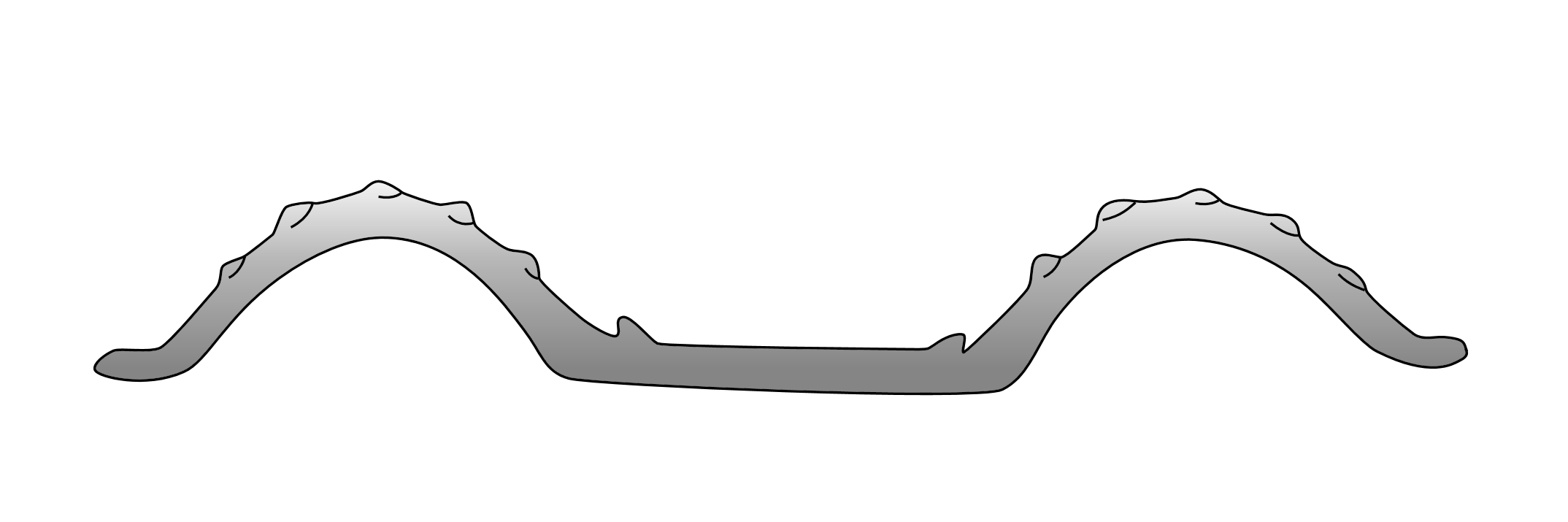
Bronze rein holder for chariots.

The Karasuk culture had horse-drawn spoke-wheeled chariots, a technology first attested in the Sintashta culture (c. 2000 BC) which spread eastwards with the Andronovo culture. Although no Karasuk chariots have been found, their existence is indicated by petroglyph drawings, chariot equipment, horse bridles and 'charioteer burials'. These have close similarities to chariots and equipment from the Shang dynasty in China (c. 1200 BC), such as the use of wheels with numerous spokes and bow-shaped rein holders. Both Karasuk and Shang chariots also have close similarities to chariots from Lchashen in Armenia, dating from c. 1500 BC. According to Wu (2013) Shang chariots and their associated equipment originated from the Karasuk culture and can be understood as "a local version of the Karasuk set."

== Metallurgy ==
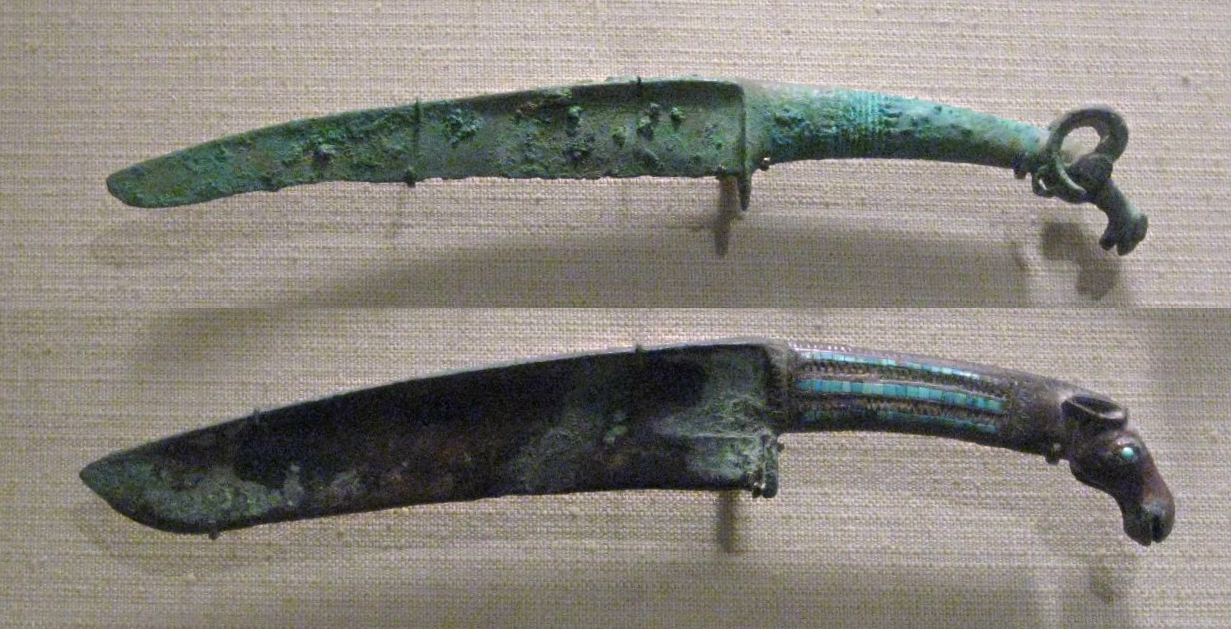
Shang dynasty curved bronze knives with animal pommel. 12th-11th century BCE. Such knives were the result of contacts with the northern people of the Mongolian steppe.

The metallurgy of the Karasuk culture may have derived from the earlier Seima-Turbino tradition. It expanded on this tradition, and became the core of a regional hub in metallurgy, sometimes called the "East Asian Metallurgical Province". (Note: Chernykh 2008, p. 90: "The East Asian Metallurgical Province [EasAsMP]. (...) As mentioned above, the EasAsMP’s earliest phase was associated with the striking Seima-Turbino transcultural phenomenon, and subsequently it seems to continue the Seima-Turbino traditions of metallurgy and metal processing. The most important materials characteristic of the early EasAsMP come from burials of the widely known Karasuk cultures (Chlenova 1972; Chernykh 1992: 264-271) (13). The numerous metal finds come from graves, most of which have been destroyed by recent tillage.")

Seima-Turbino had a westward expansion, encountering the Abashevo and Sintashta cultures during the 2200-1700 BCE period. On the contrary, the expansion of the Karasuk metallurgical culture was eastward. Karasuk styles were copied throughout Central and Eastern Asia, reaching China where numerous bronze objects on the Karasuk model have been excavated. In particular the royal complex of the Anyang Cemetery from the 13-11th centuries BCE during the Shang dynasty period is known for numerous such imitations.

It is thought that these metallurgical innovations from the Karasuk culture were transmitted by steppe nomads, within a context of rather conflictual relations between China and its northern neighbours. The Shang mainly imitated the curved one-edged knives with animal handles, and placed them in their tombs among other bronze paraphernalia. Altogether, these influences travelled over a distance of more than 3,500 kilometers, from the Sayan-Altai region to the heart of ancient China beyond the Yellow River.

Weapons of the contemporary Deer stones culture, as seen in their petroglyphs, are generally derived from those of the Karasuk culture, and belong to the Karasuk typology.

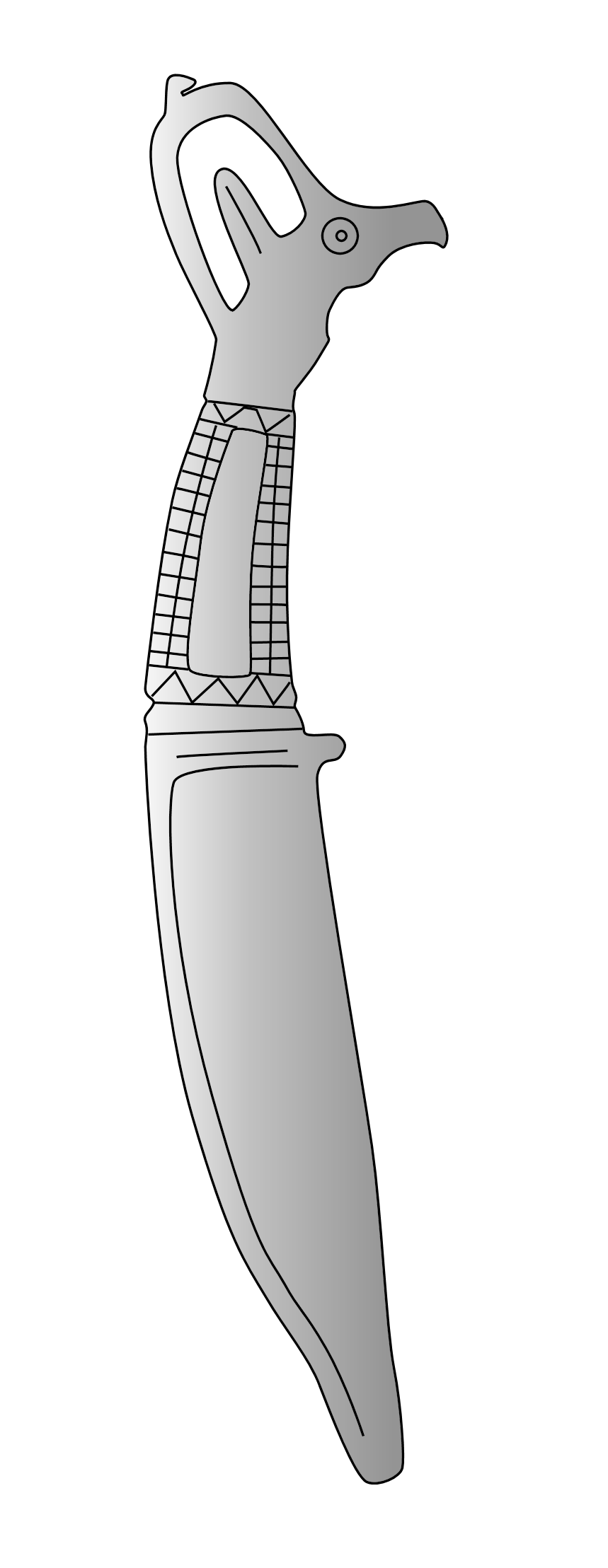
Karasuk culture. Animal-headed knife with curved blade.

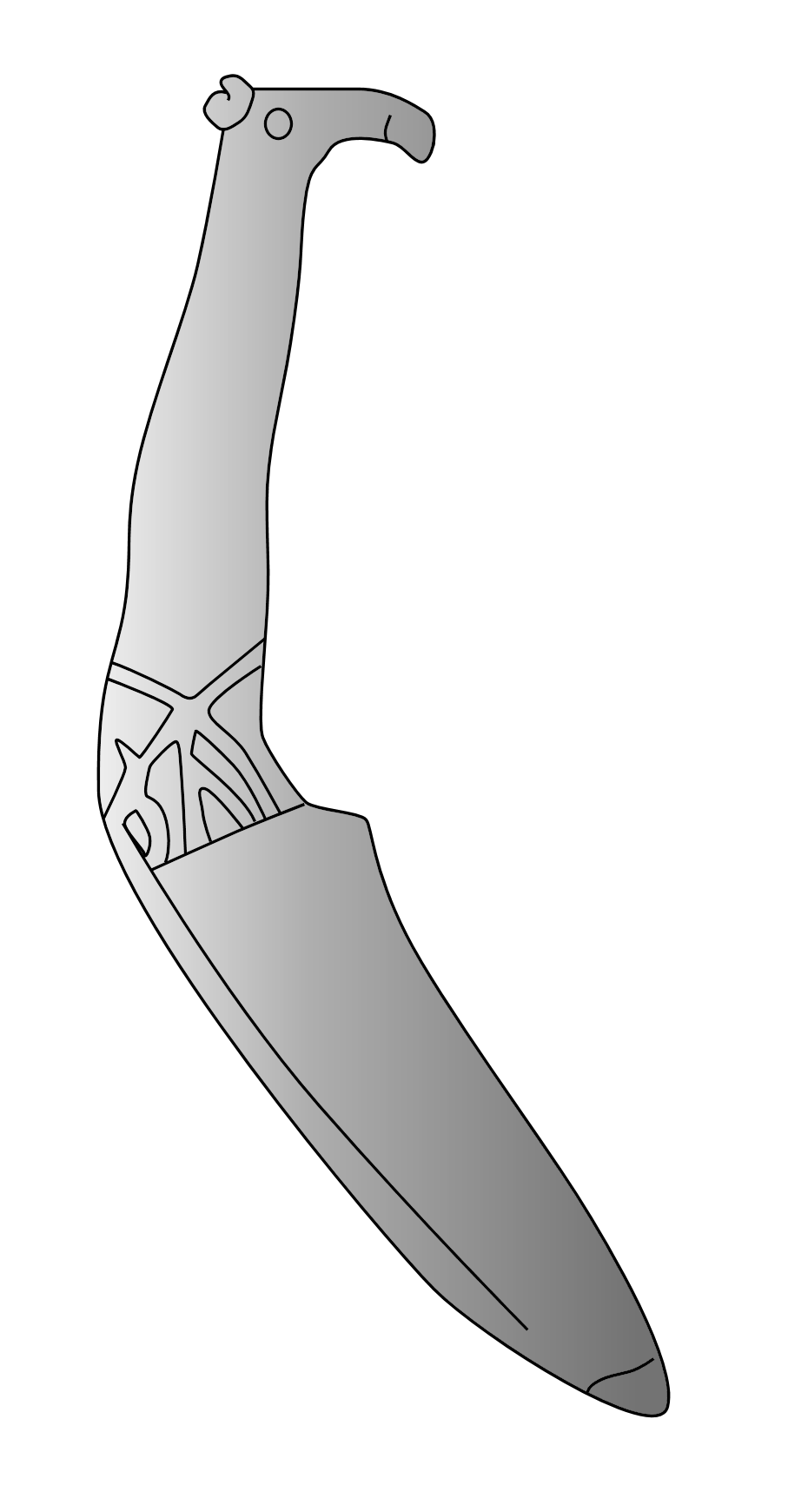
Karasuk culture. Horse-headed knife.

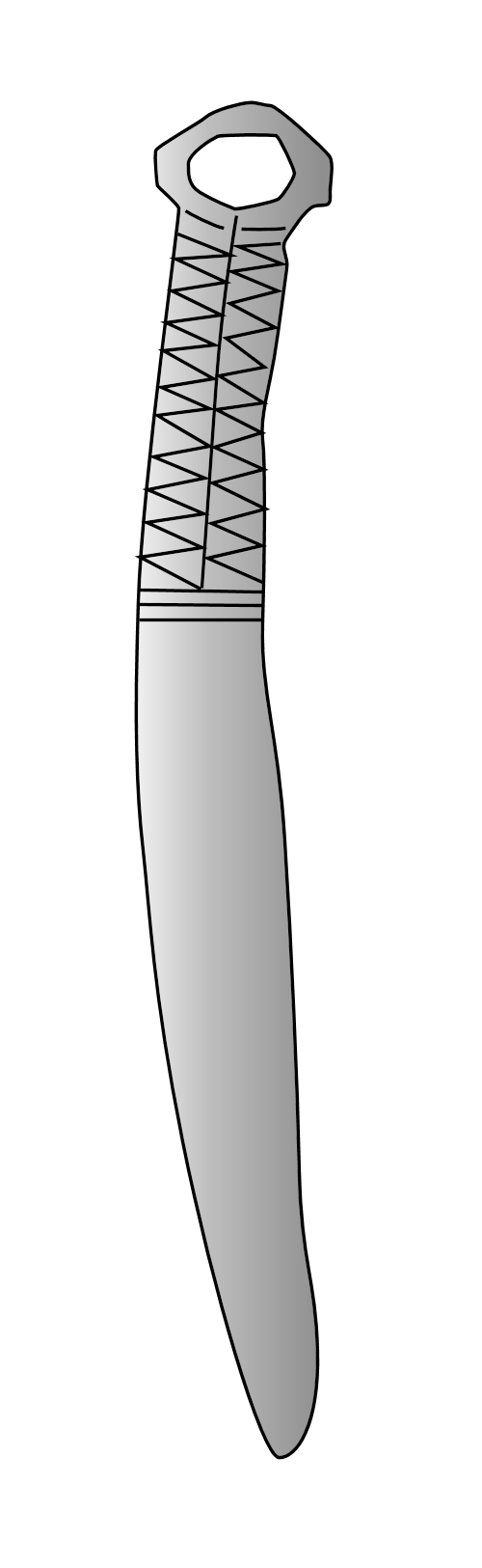
Karasuk culture. Knife with ring.

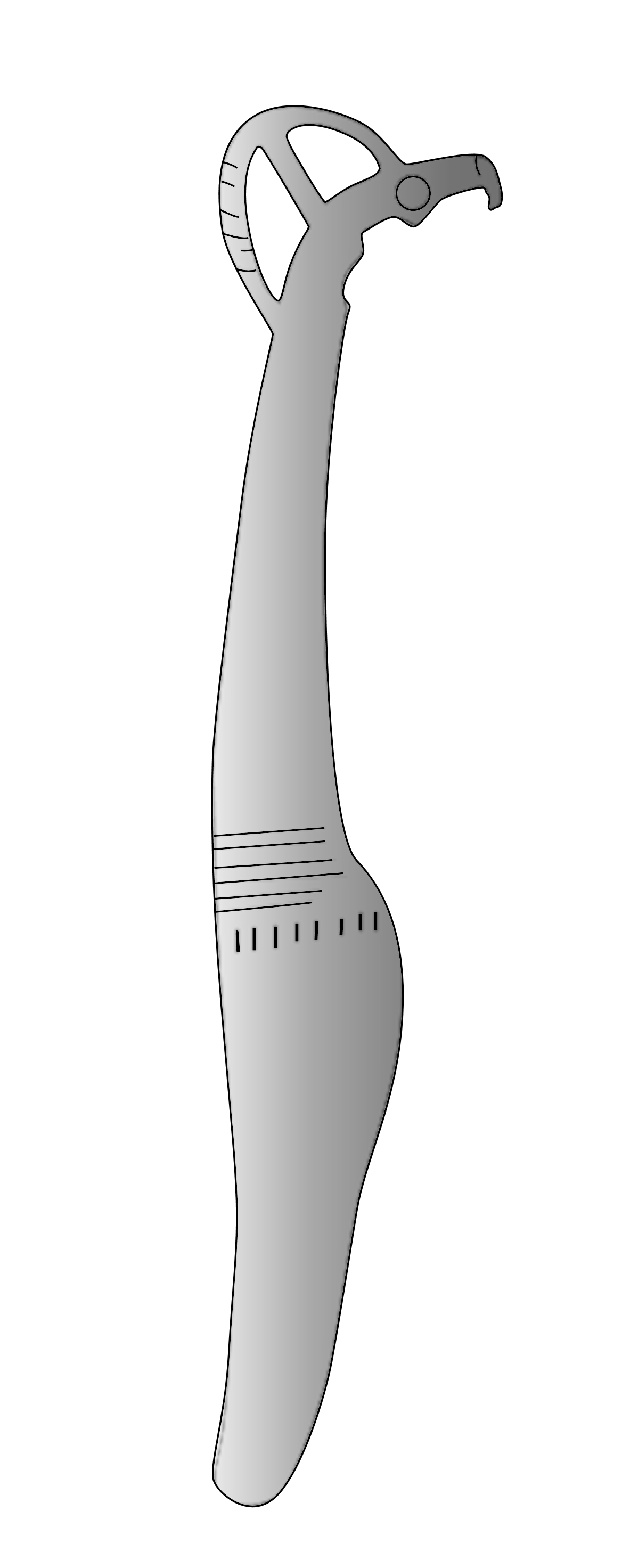
Karasuk culture. Animal-headed knife.

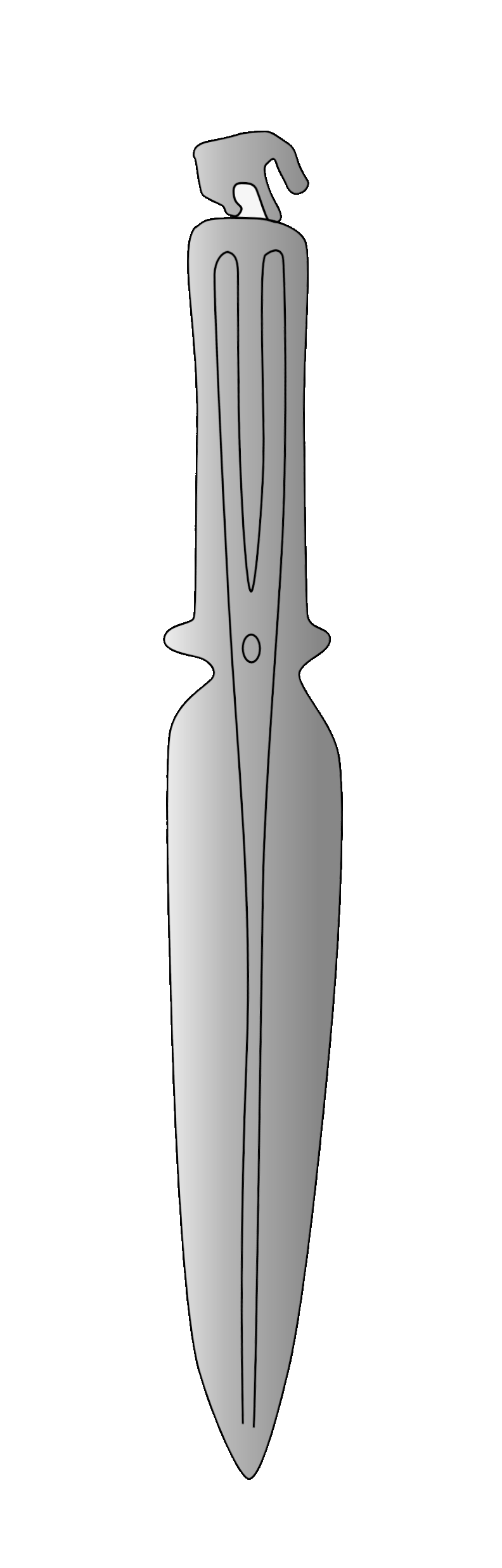
Karasuk culture. Dagger with animal top.

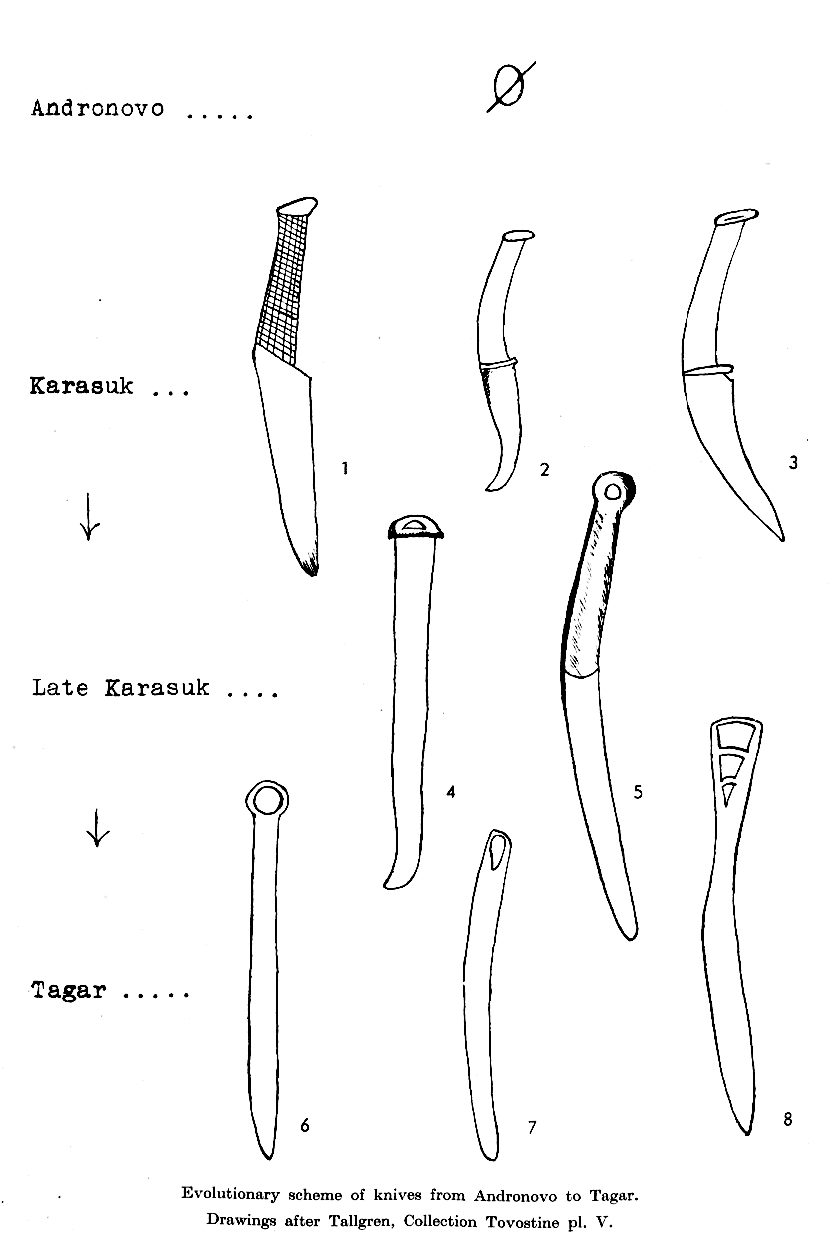
Evolution of bronze knives, from the Karasuk culture to the Tagar culture

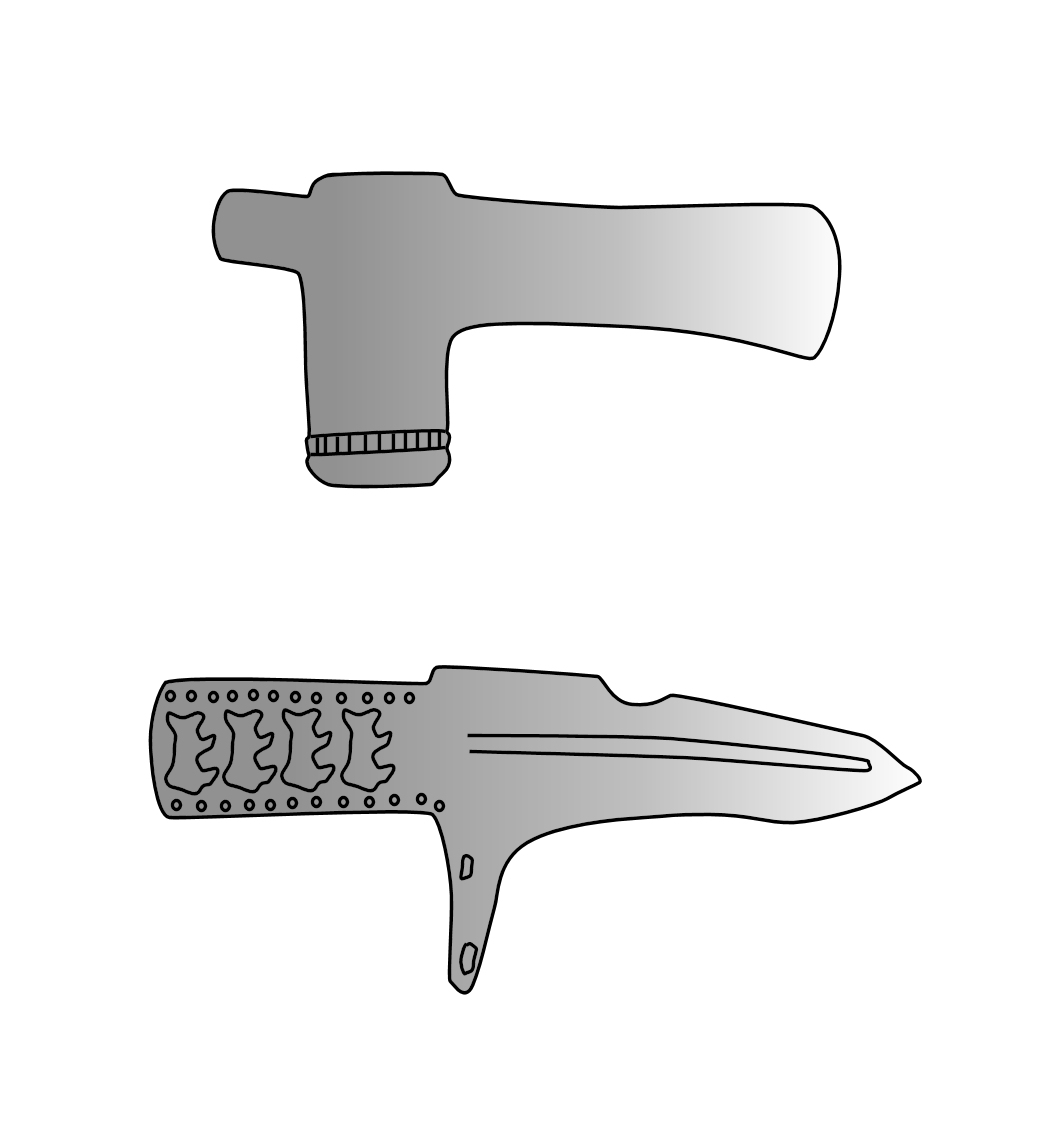
Karasuk bronze axes.

=== Comparisons of Karasuk and Chinese Shang-Zhou blades ===
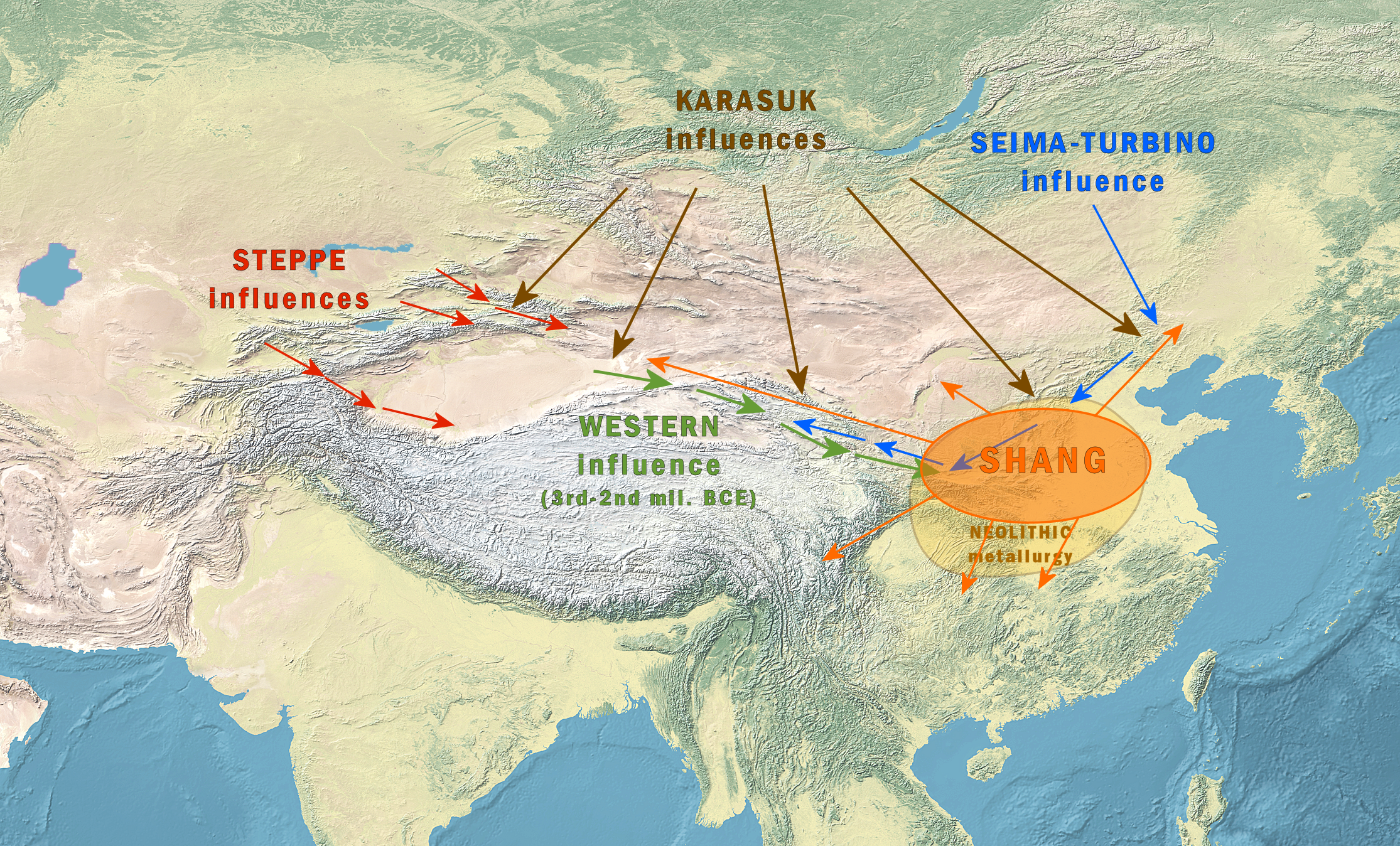
Historical influences on Chinese metallurgy. After a small early copper industry in the Neolithic, China was influenced by the metallurgy of the steppes (Andronovo culture), the Seima-Turbino phenomenon and the Karasuk culture down to the Shang dynasty period.

Many bronze blades of the Shang dynasty (13th-11th centuries BCE) and Zhou dynasty were derived from Karasuk designs.

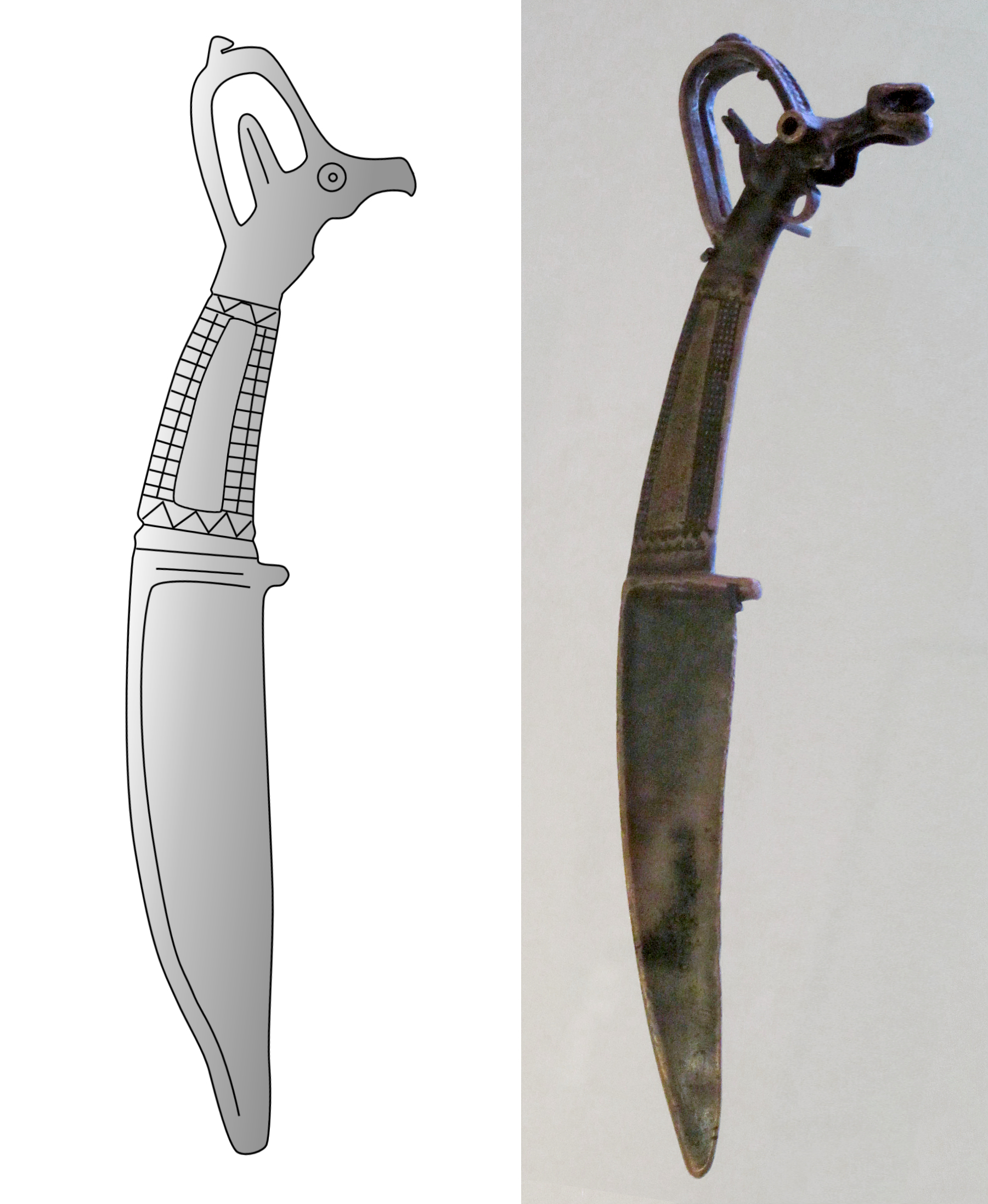
Karasuk vs Shang horned animal blades 13th-11th century BCE.

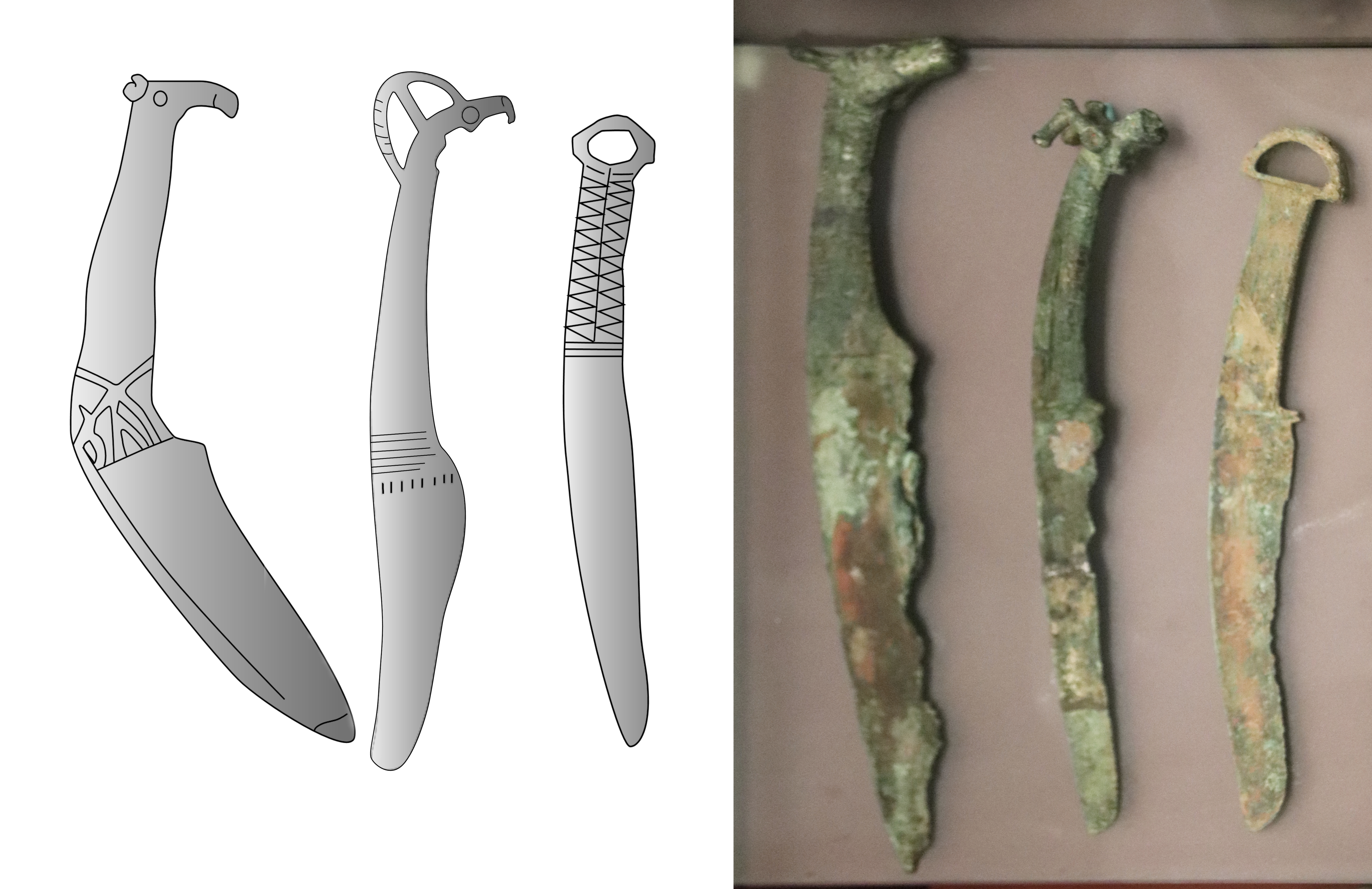
Karasuk blades vs Shang dynasty Yinxu blades.

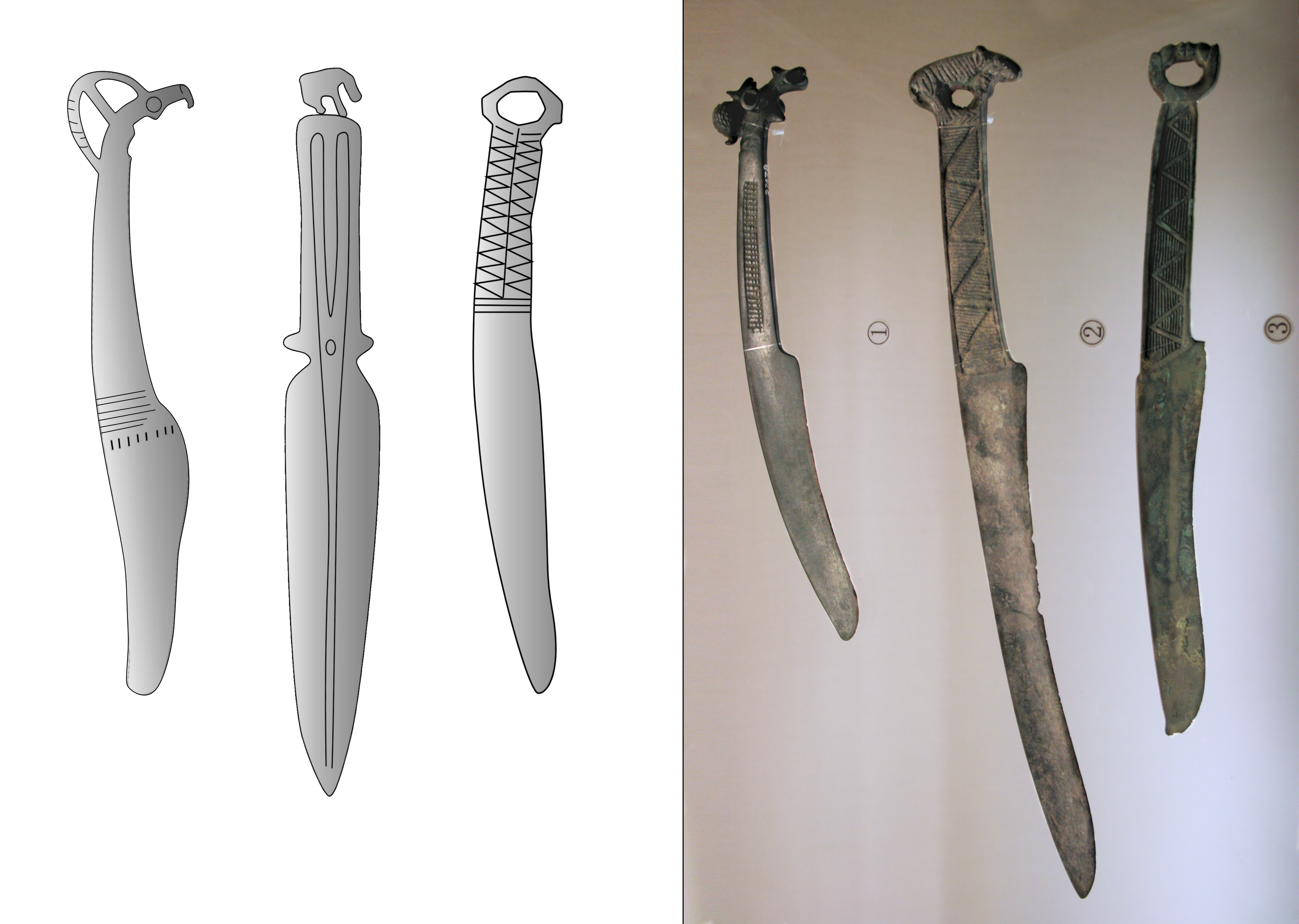
Karasuk culture blades vs Shang-Zhou blades.

== Physical characteristics ==
In a study from 2024, individuals of the Karasuk culture were described by physical anthropologists as exhibiting traits intermediate between those of the Andronovo and Okunev cultures. They are most closely associated with subsequent and neighboring groups, such as the Saka and Sauromatians populations of Central Asia.

== Genetics ==
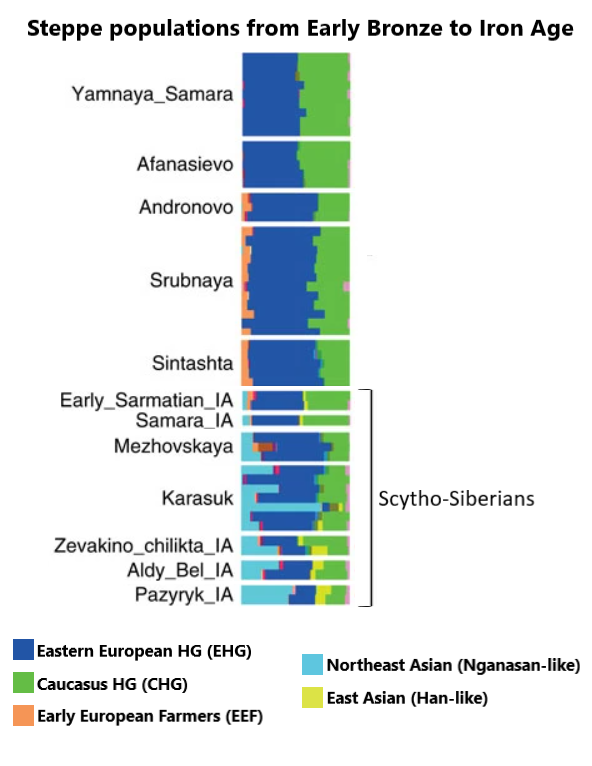
Genetic makeup of Bronze and Iron Age Steppe populations

Keyser et al. (2009) published a genetic study of ancient Siberian cultures, the Andronovo, Karasuk, Tagar, and Tashtyk cultures. They surveyed four individuals of the Karasuk culture of four different sites from 1400 BC to 800 BC. Two of these possessed the Western Eurasian mtDNA U5a1 and U4 lineages. The two males belonged to Y-chromosome haplogroup R1a1, considered indicative of the eastward migration of the early Indo-Europeans. The individuals surveyed were all determined to be light-eyed. A study by Allentoft et al. (2015) found that three of the four male samples from the Karasuk culture belonged to Y-chromosome haplogroup R1a1, while one belonged to Q1a2a.

A subsequent genetic study from 2020 modeled individuals from the Karasuk culture as deriving approximately 65% of their ancestry from the Sintashta culture and 35% from Ancient Northeast Asian (ANA) hunter-gatherers from the Lake Baikal region. The authors of the study found that the Karasuk culture lacked the ancestral component associated with the Bactria–Margiana Archaeological Complex (ca. 7%–28%) observed in Iron Age groups in Central Asia.

== Sites ==
Sites are not numerous, and are mainly found southwest of the Minusinsk basin. They consist in semi-subterranean houses and larger winter houses about 100-200 m2 in area, with domed or pitched roofs covered with earth to protect against the cold.

== Gallery ==
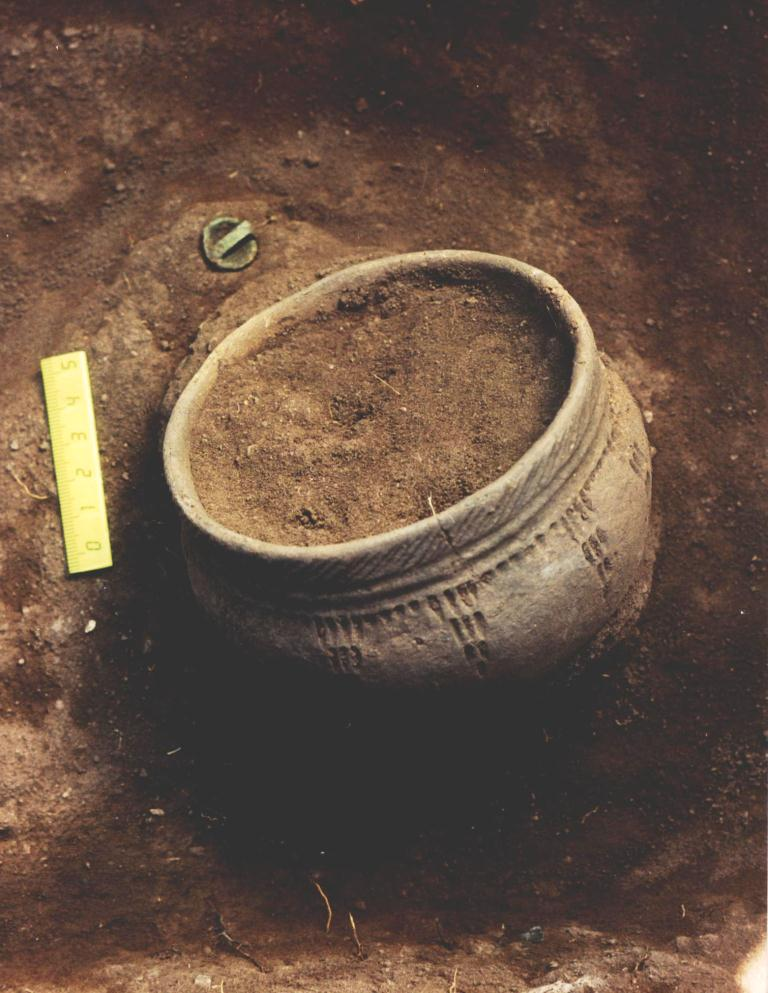
Pottery of the Karasuk culture

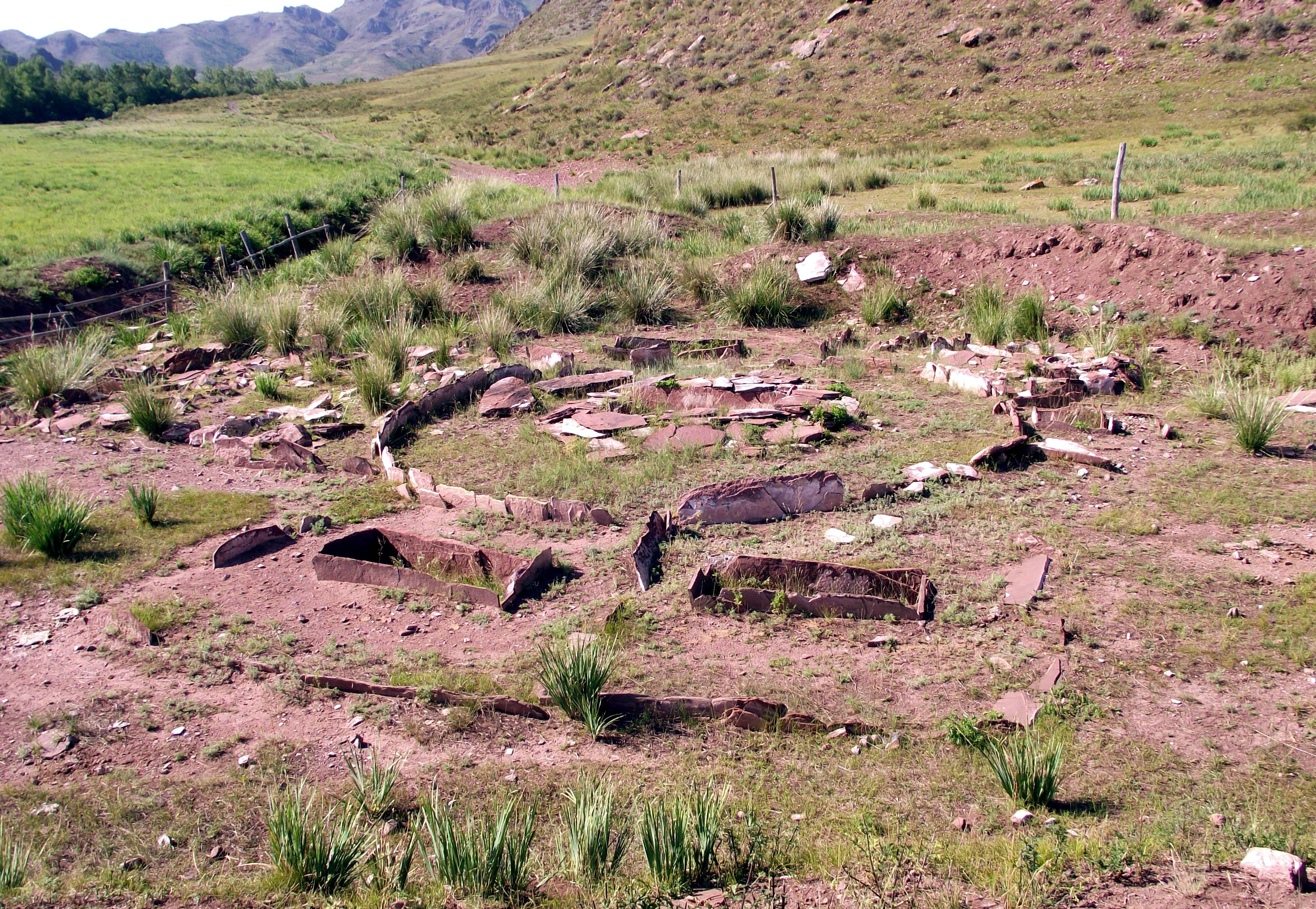
Karasuk grave (53.209951°N 90.111969°E)

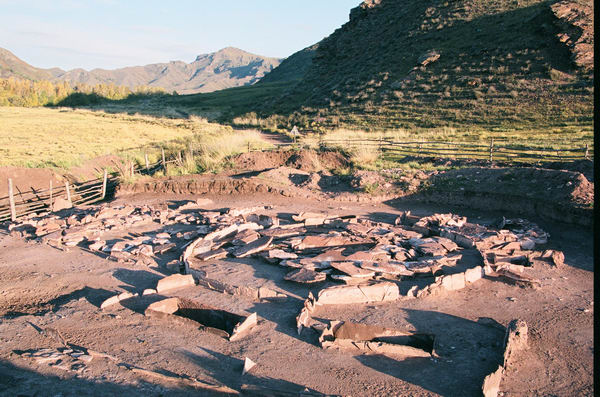
Karasuk grave

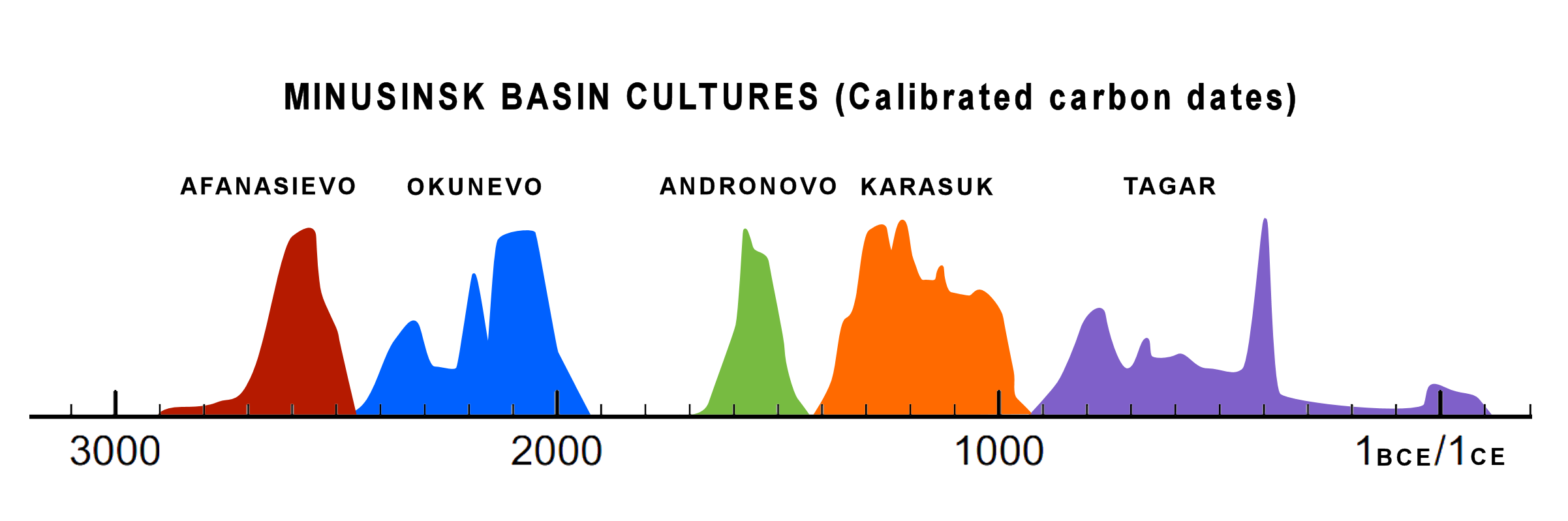
Minusinsk Basin cultures (Summed probability distribution for new human bone dates, Afanasievo to Tagar cultures).

== See also ==
- Shang dynasty

== Sources ==
- Mallory, J. P. (1997). Encyclopedia of Indo-European Culture. Taylor & Francis. ISBN 978-1884964985.
- Chernykh, Evgeny (30 December 2008). "The "Steppe Belt" of stockbreeding cultures in Eurasia during the Early Metal Age". Trabajos de Prehistoria. 65 (2). doi:10.3989/tp.2008.08004.
- Rawson, Jessica; Chugunov, Konstantin; Grebnev, Yegor; Huan, Limin (June 2020). "Chariotry and Prone Burials: Reassessing Late Shang China's Relationship with Its Northern Neighbours". Journal of World Prehistory. 33 (2): 135–168. doi:10.1007/s10963-020-09142-4.
