= Rein hook =

Device to hold the reins of a chariot

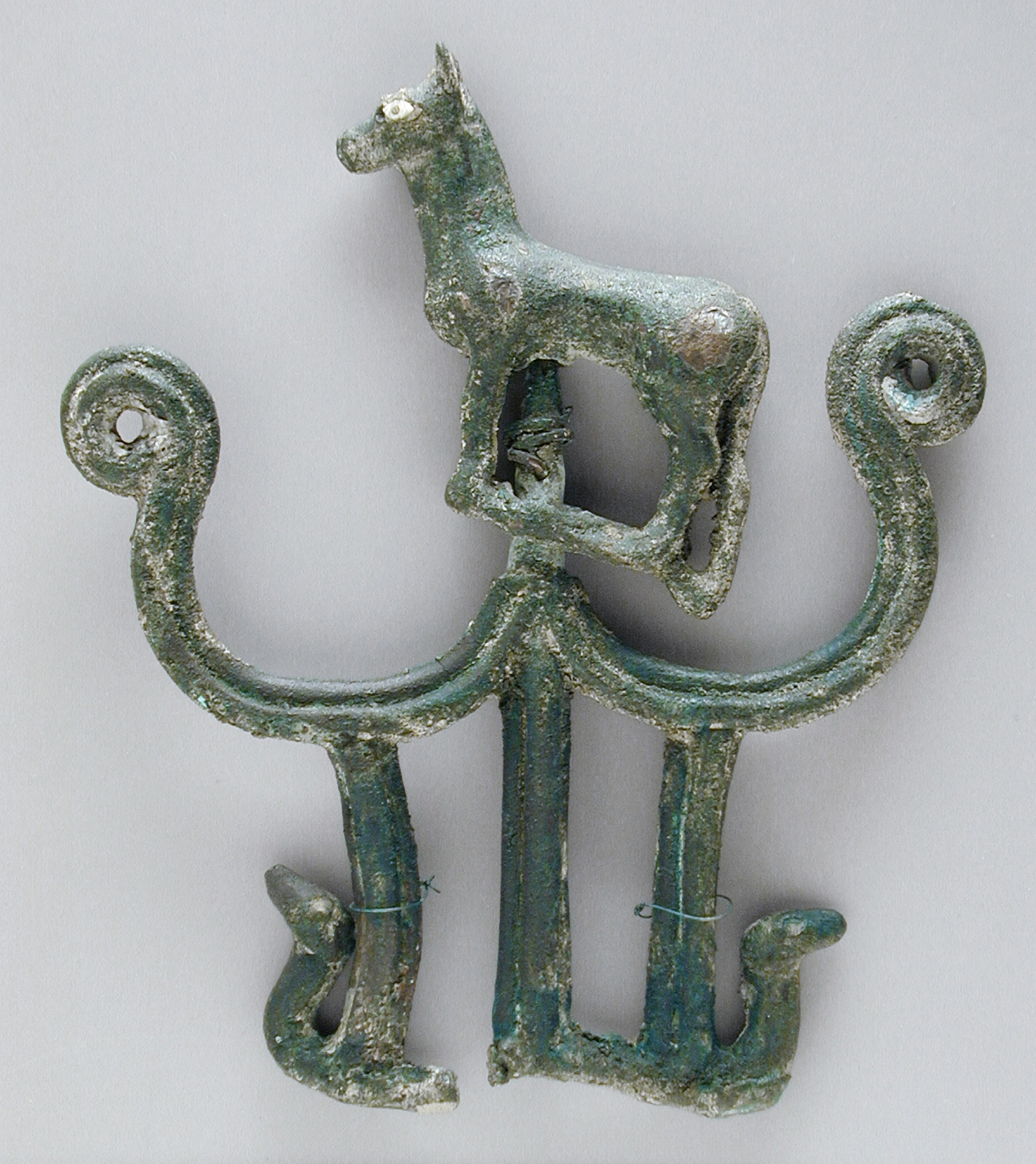
Chariot rein ring. Iran, Elamite, circa 2600-2400 BCE. LACMA.

A rein hook, or rein holder is a device used in chariotry. It is designed to hold the reins in place when the driver is away, or his hands are used for something else than driving. It is used to free the rider's hands. It is held in place by a "charioteer's belt".

== Characteristics ==
"Narrow-back rein holders" were probably hung to the rider's waist. They worked as rein hooks, attached at the belt, for horse control.

"Broad-back rein holders" were probably fixed at the leading edge of the carriage to hold the reins. They may also have been attached at the belt of the charioter for hands-free control.

Rein holders were probably introduced in China circa 1200 BCE, where they first appear at Yinxu, from the Northern Zones, where earlier rein holders are known as far as the Minusinsk basin.

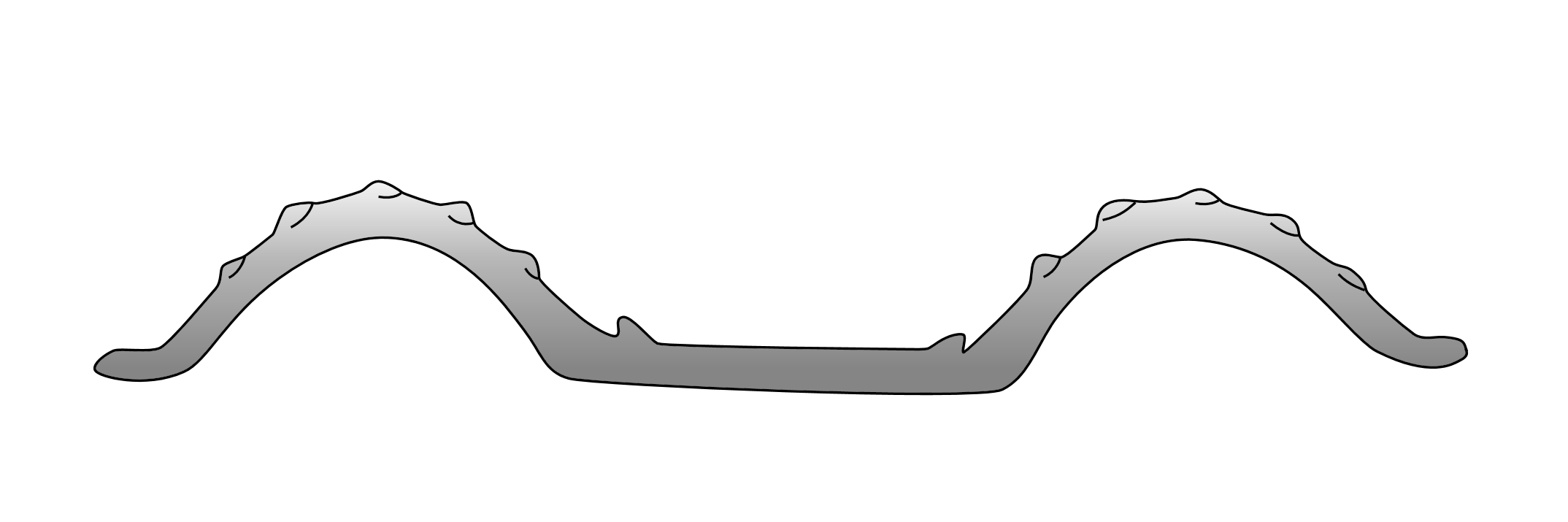
Karasuk culture bronze rein holders (1500-500 BCE)

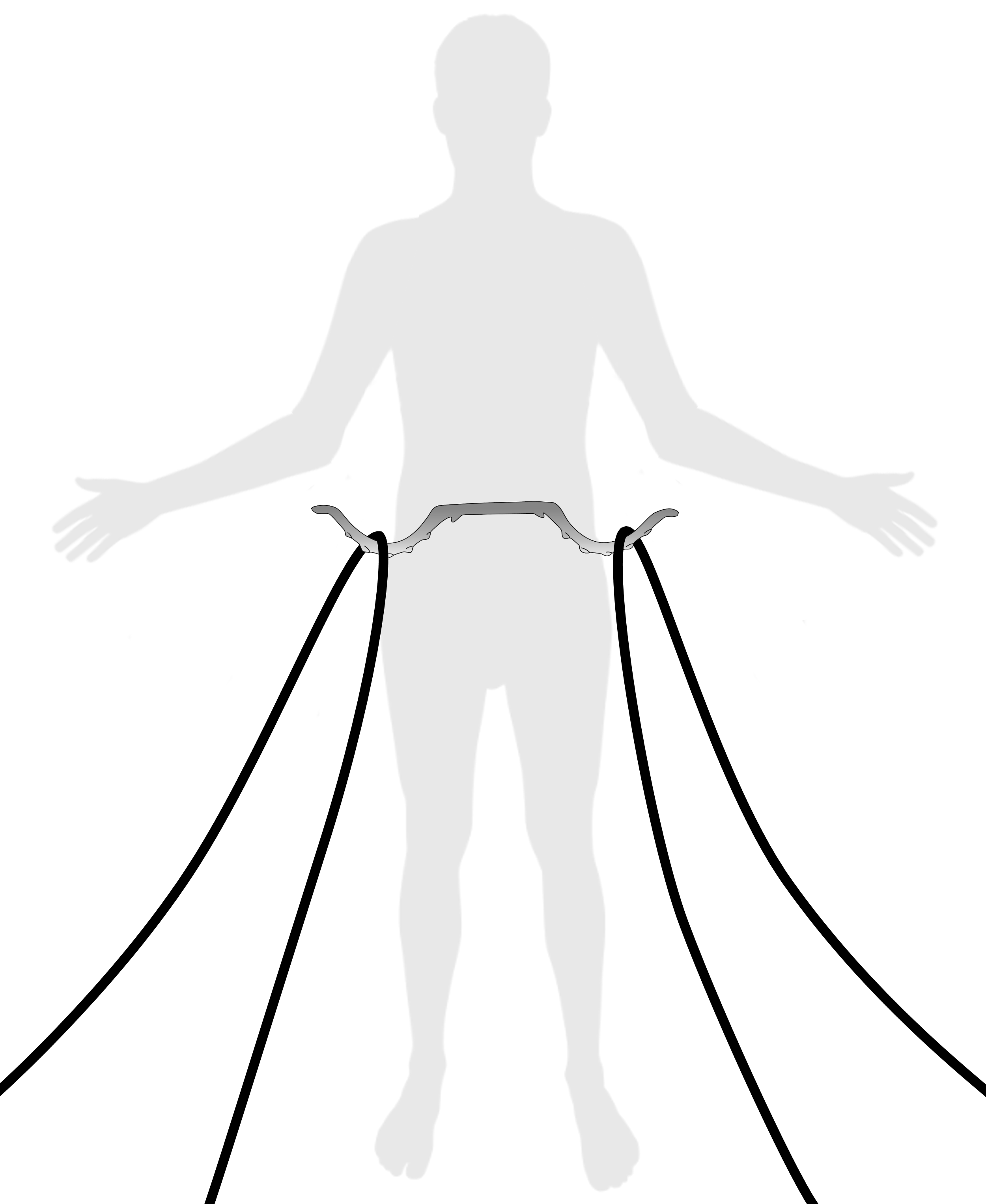
Rein holder in position, as discovered in a burial in the Askizsky region of Khakassia, Southern Siberia. Lugav culture, Late Bronze Age, 11th-8th century BCE.

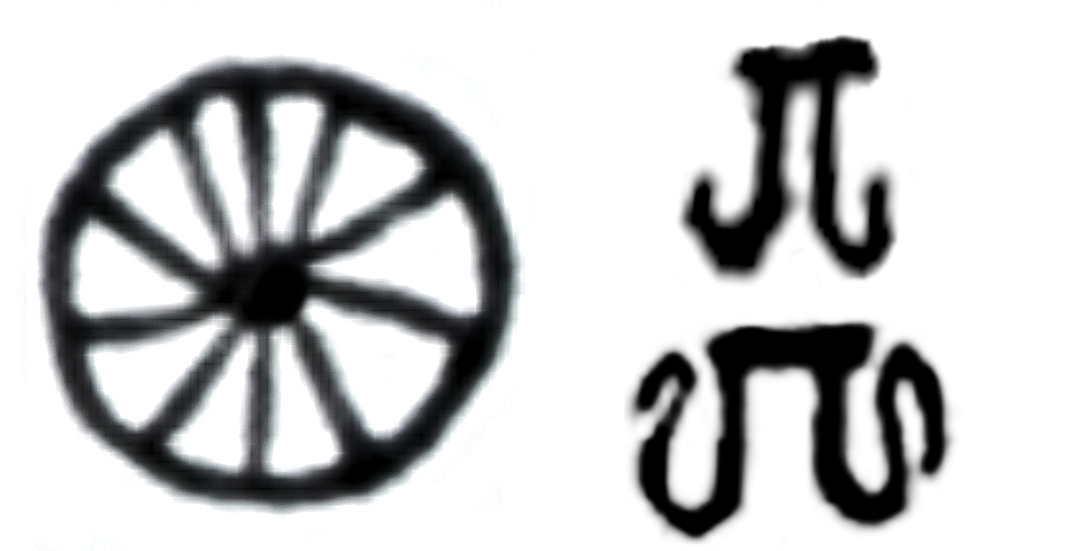
Wheel and rein holders in deer stones culture petroglyphs, circa 1000 BCE

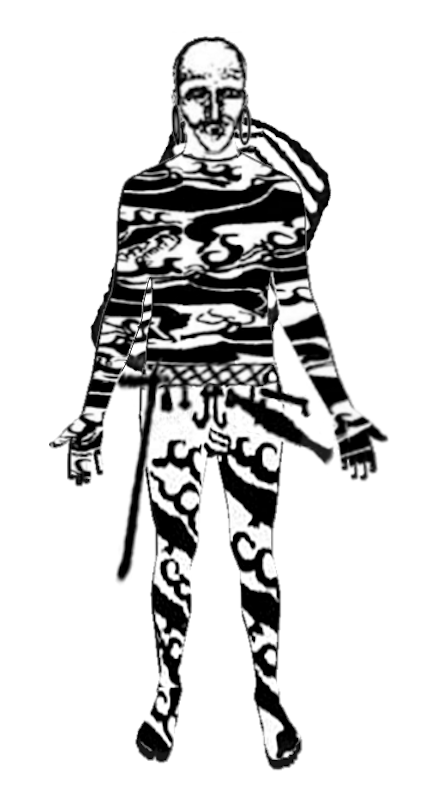
A Deer stone charioteer with rein hook (hypothetical reconstruction).

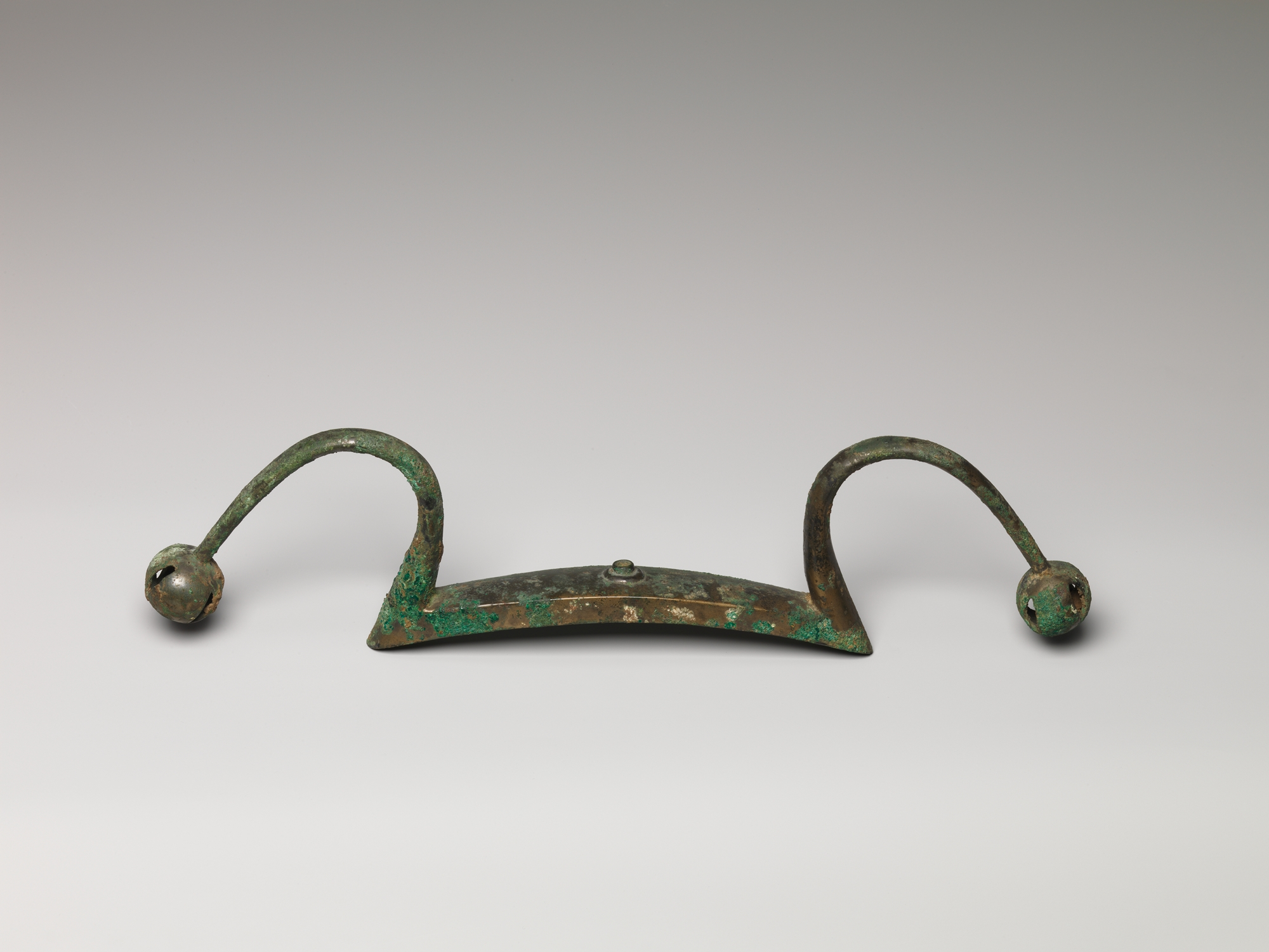
Chinese bronze rein holder, ca. 11th century BCE. The span is 38.7 cm.

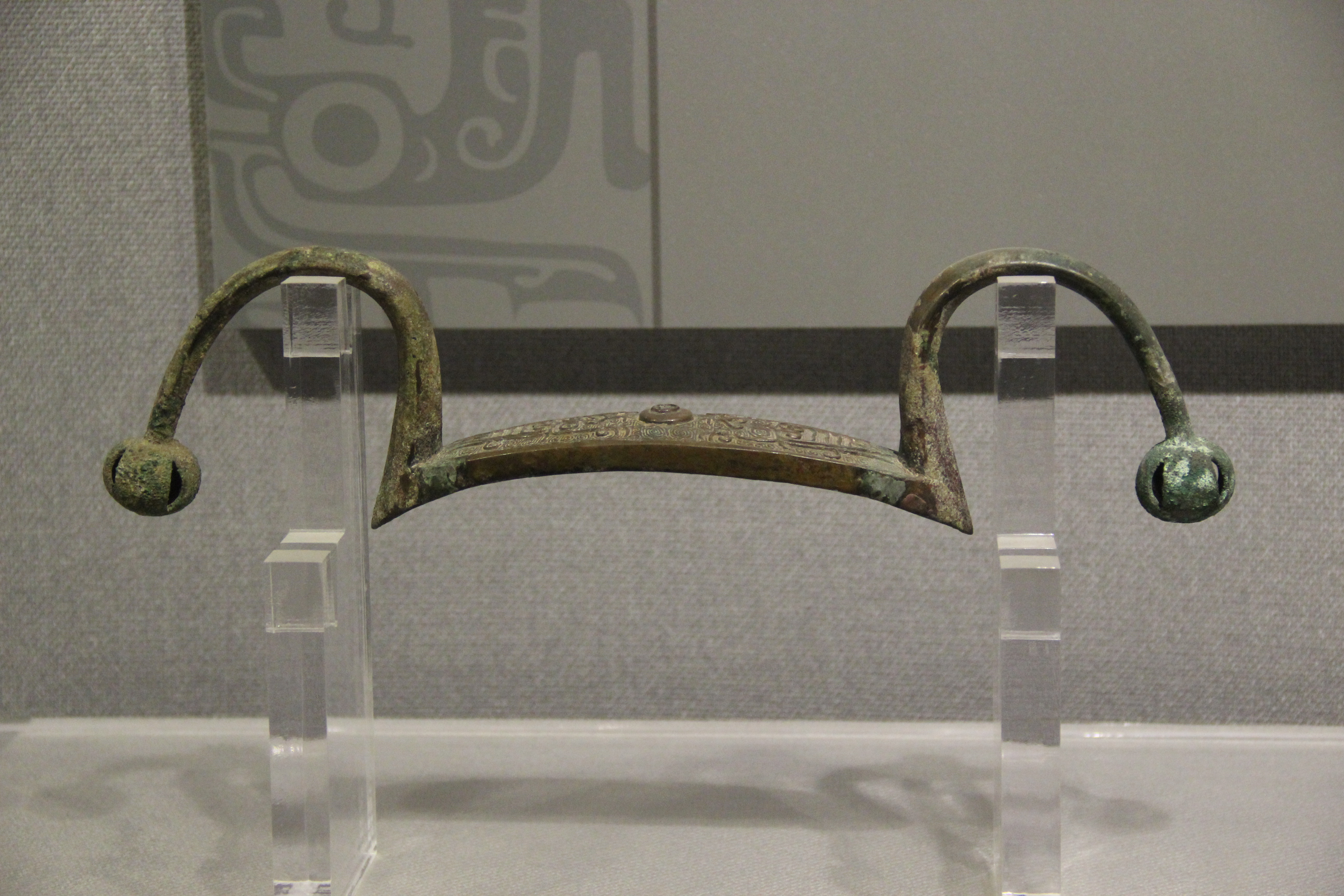
Western Zhou rein holder

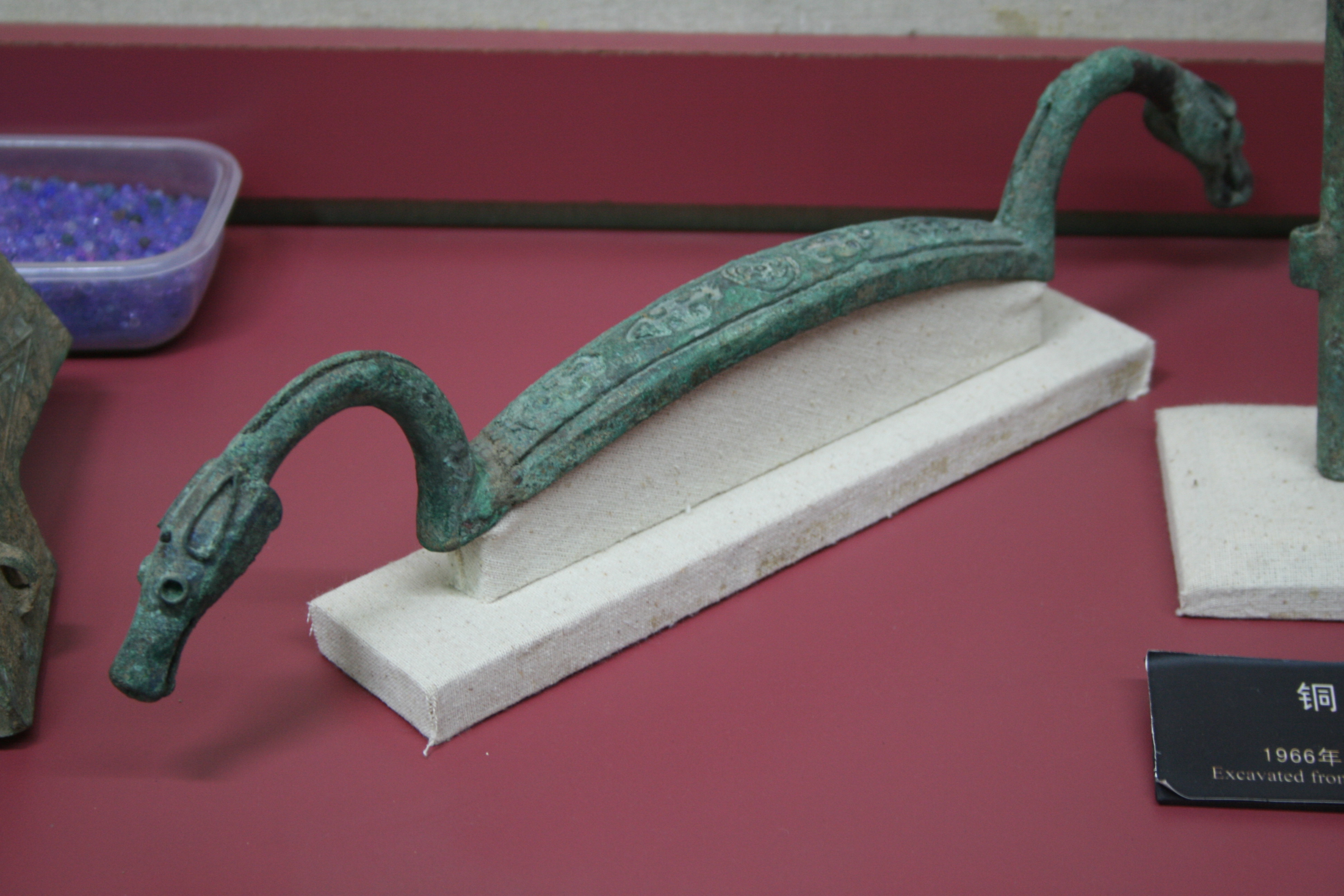
Shang rein hook, with horse-head endings. Yinxu Museum

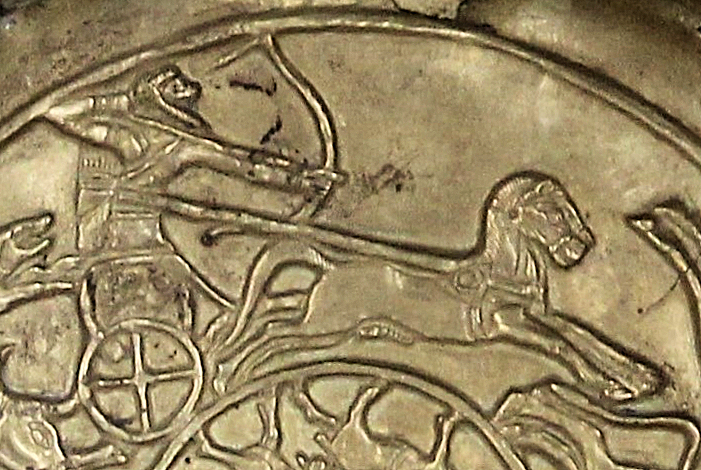
Hunter controlling his chariot from the waist, Ugarit, 15th-14th century BCE.

== See also ==
- Terret

== Sources ==
- Rawson, Jessica; Huan, Limin; Taylor, William Timothy Treal (December 2021). "Seeking Horses: Allies, Clients and Exchanges in the Zhou Period (1045–221 BC)". Journal of World Prehistory. 34 (4): 489–530. doi:10.1007/s10963-021-09161-9.

== See also ==
- Horse tack
- Horse harness
- Draught horse
- Horse-drawn vehicle
