= Uyuk culture =

Siberian culture (8th-2nd century BCE)

Coordinates: 52.071606°N 93.631836°E

- Uyuk Culture (here the Sagly-Bazhy culture phase) and contemporary cultures and polities circa 325 BCE
- Geographical range: South Siberia
- Dates: 8th to 2nd century BCE
- Preceded by: Karasuk culture
- Followed by: Xiongnu Empire, Kokel Culture

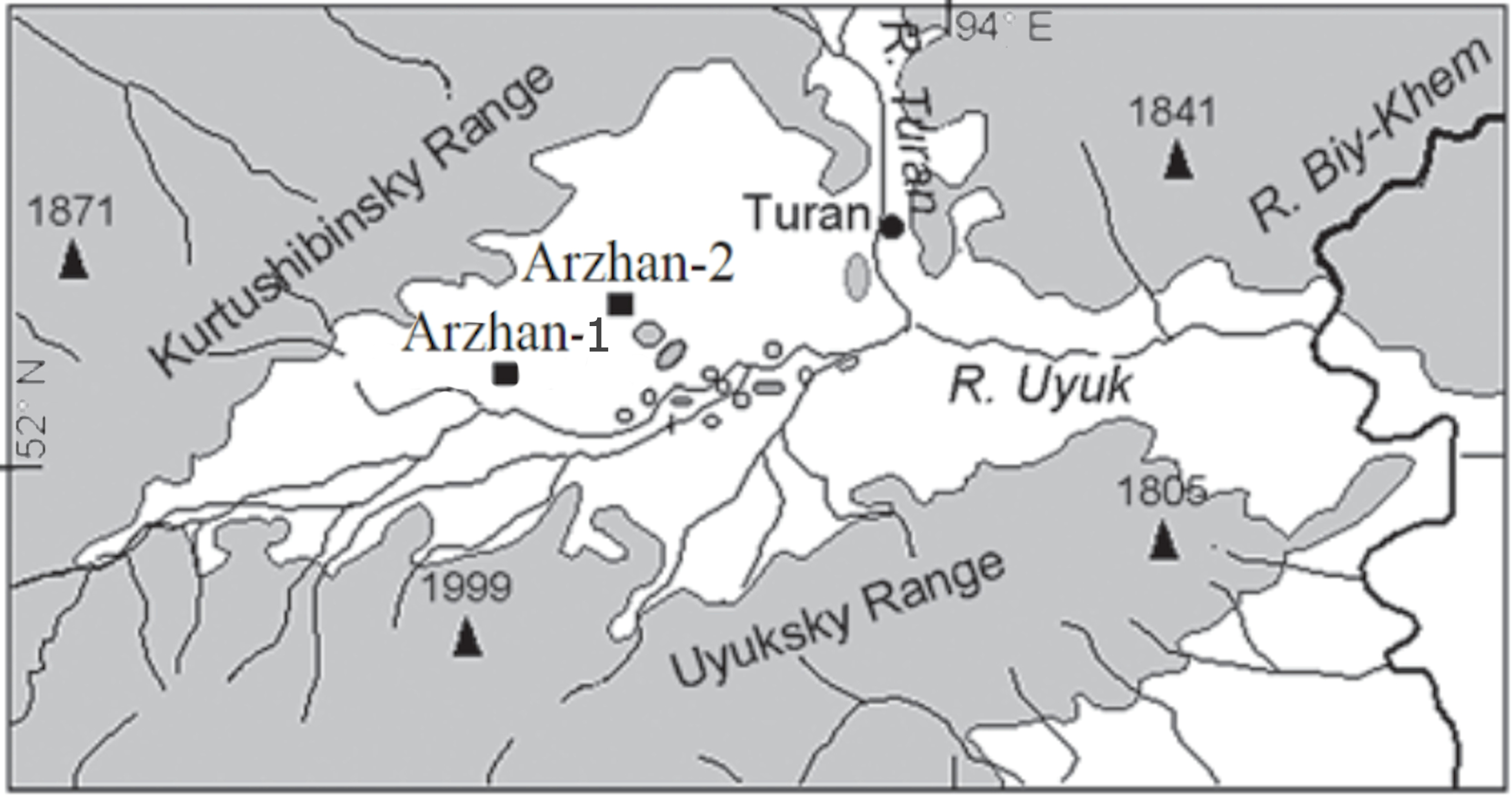
Uyuk Valley, with location of Arzhan 2.

The Uyuk culture refers to the Saka culture of the Turan-Uyuk depression around the Uyuk river, in modern-day Tuva Republic.

== Cultures ==
This period of Scythian culture covers a period from the 8th century BCE to the 2nd century BCE. The successive phases of the Uyuk culture are:

- the Arzhan culture (9th-8th century BCE)
- the Aldy-Bel culture (7th-6th century BCE)
- the Sagly-Bazhy culture/ Chandman culture (5th–3rd centuries BCE).

These Saka cultures would ultimately be replaced by the Xiongnu Empire and later the Kokel Culture.

Nearby Saka cultures were the Tagar Culture of the Minusinsk Basin, and the Pazyryk Culture in the Altai Mountains. To the east was the Slab-grave culture.

The culture of Tuva in the Scythian era is presented in Hall 30 of the State Hermitage Museum. It stopped to exist in the 2nd century BCE as a result of Xiongnu invasions.

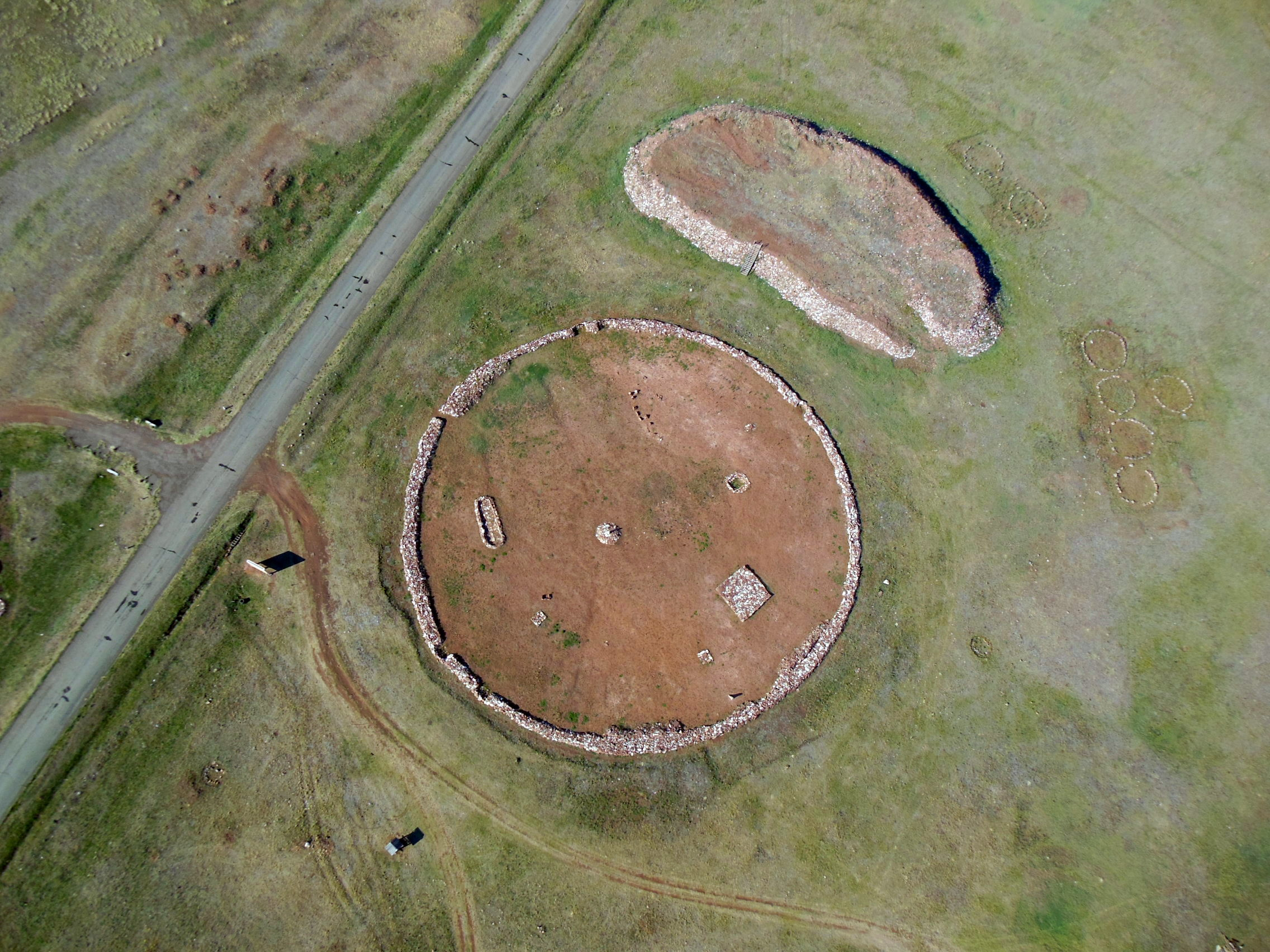
Arzhan 2 kurgan (7th-6th centuries BC, associated with the Aldy-Bel culture).

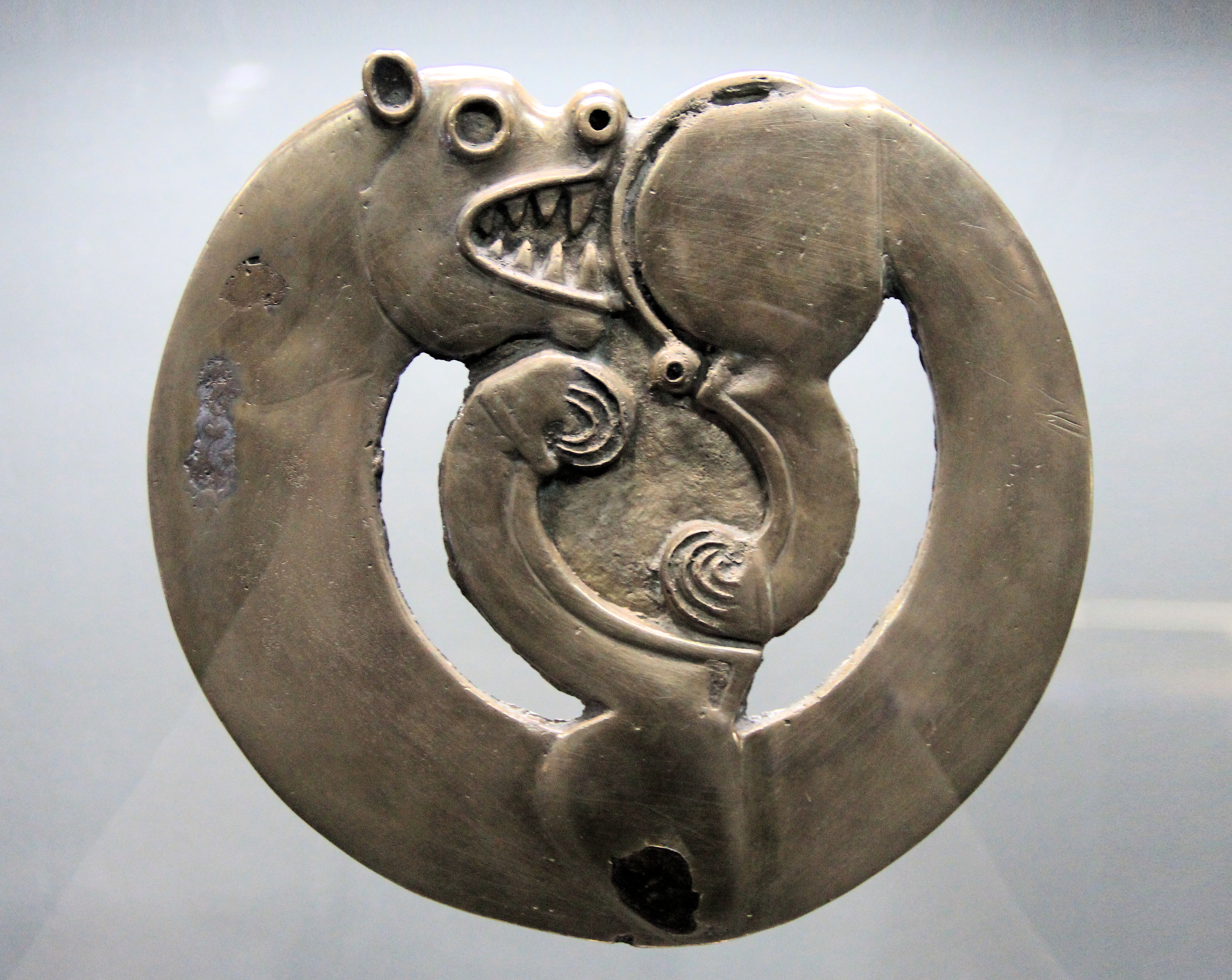
Curled-up feline animal from Arzhan-1, circa 800 BCE.

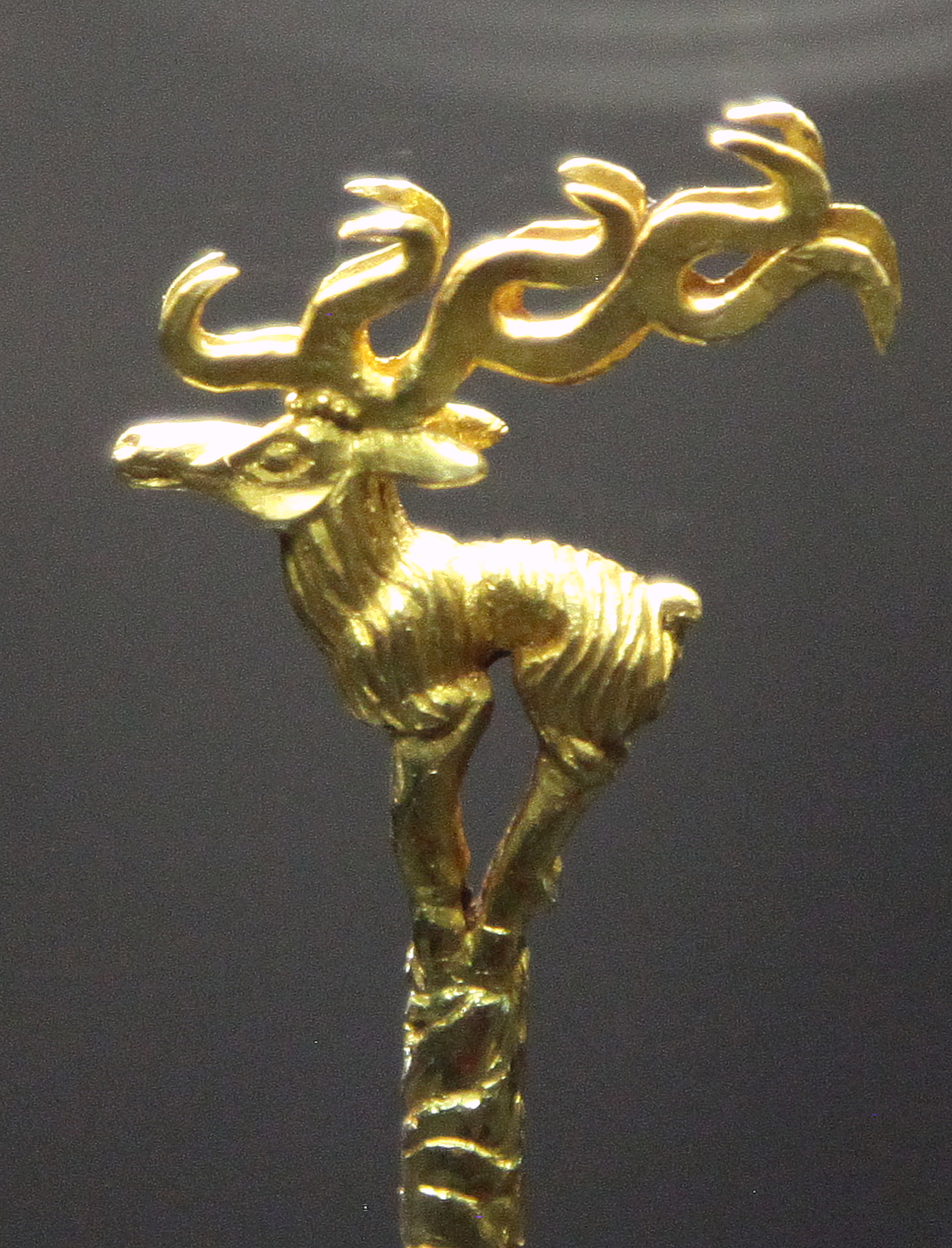
"Animal style" deer of the Arzhan culture, (7-6th century BC) Tuva.

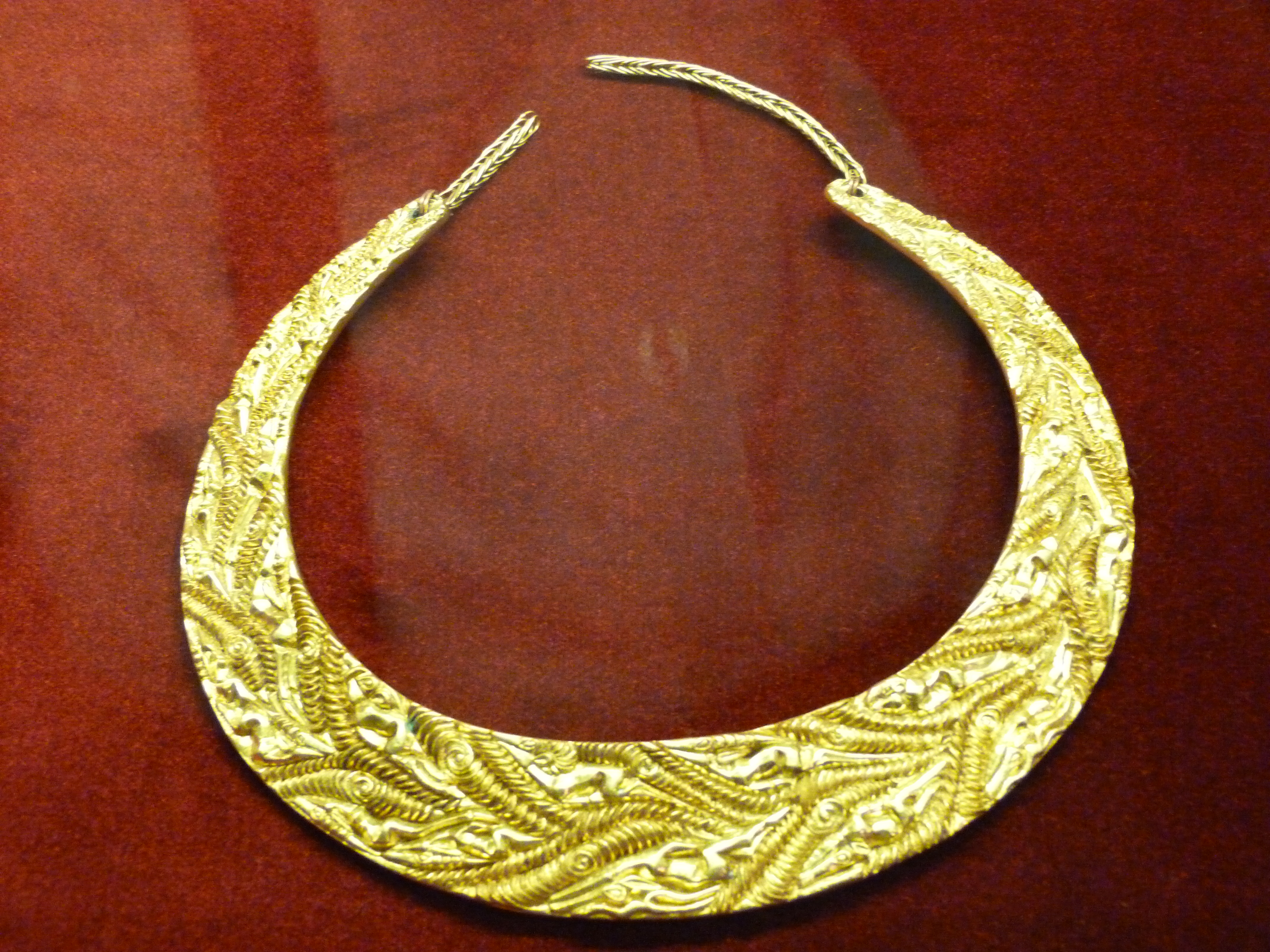
Pectoral plate, from burial mound Arzhan (7-6th century BC) Tuva.

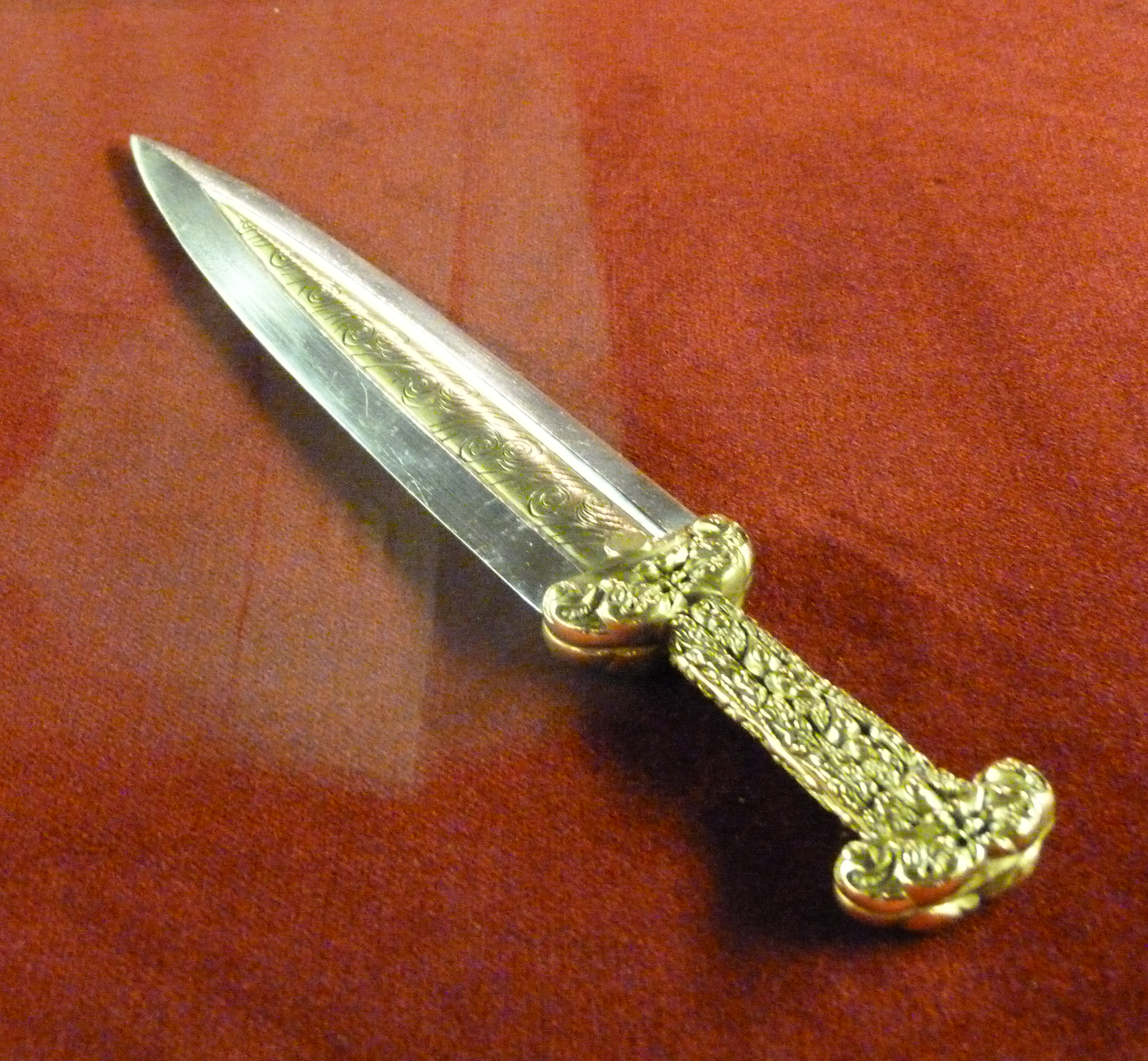
Akinak (dagger) burial mound Arzhan culture (7-6th century BC), Tuva.

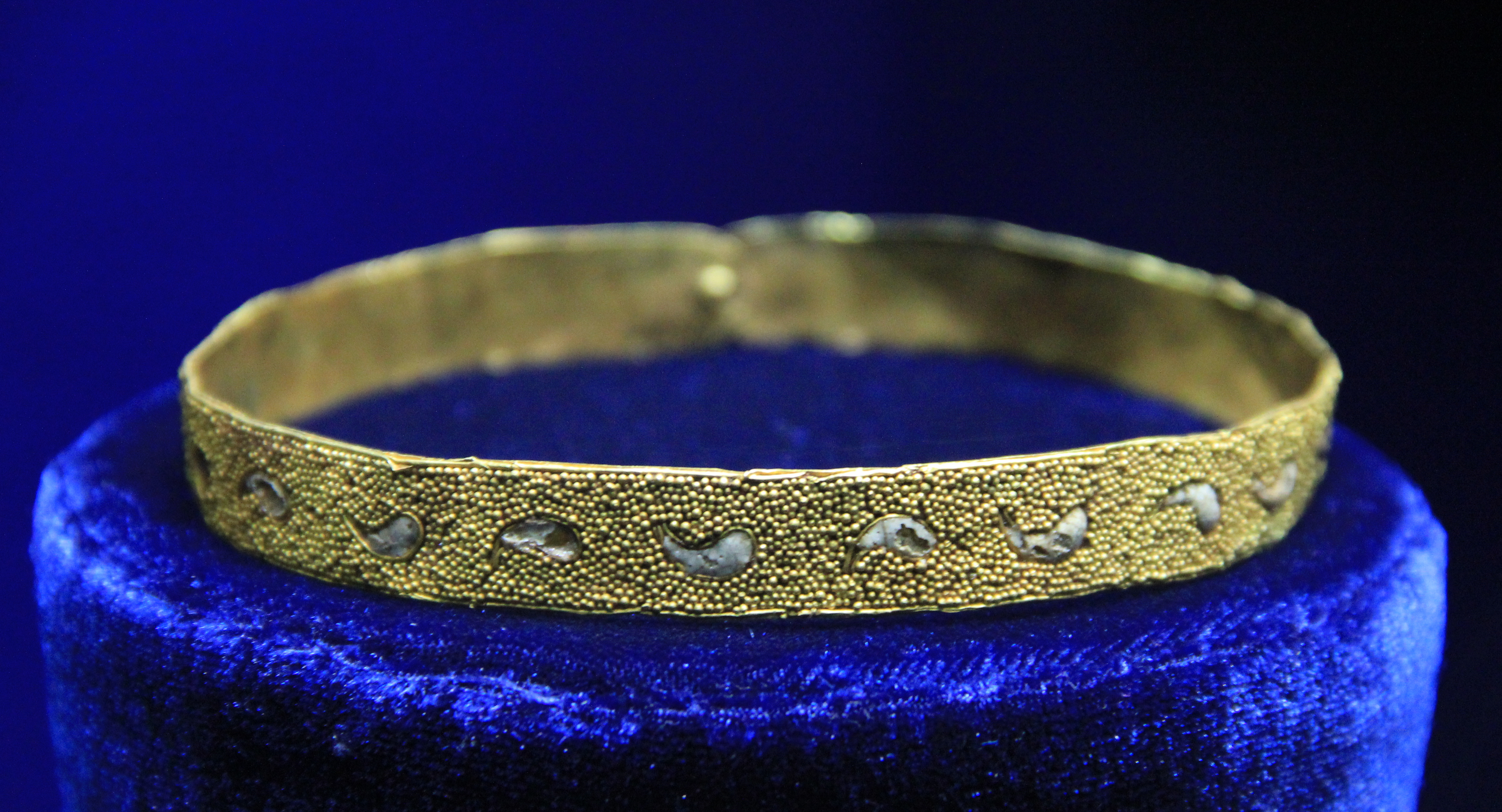
Arzhan-2 gold bracelet, Tuva National Museum.

== Genetics ==
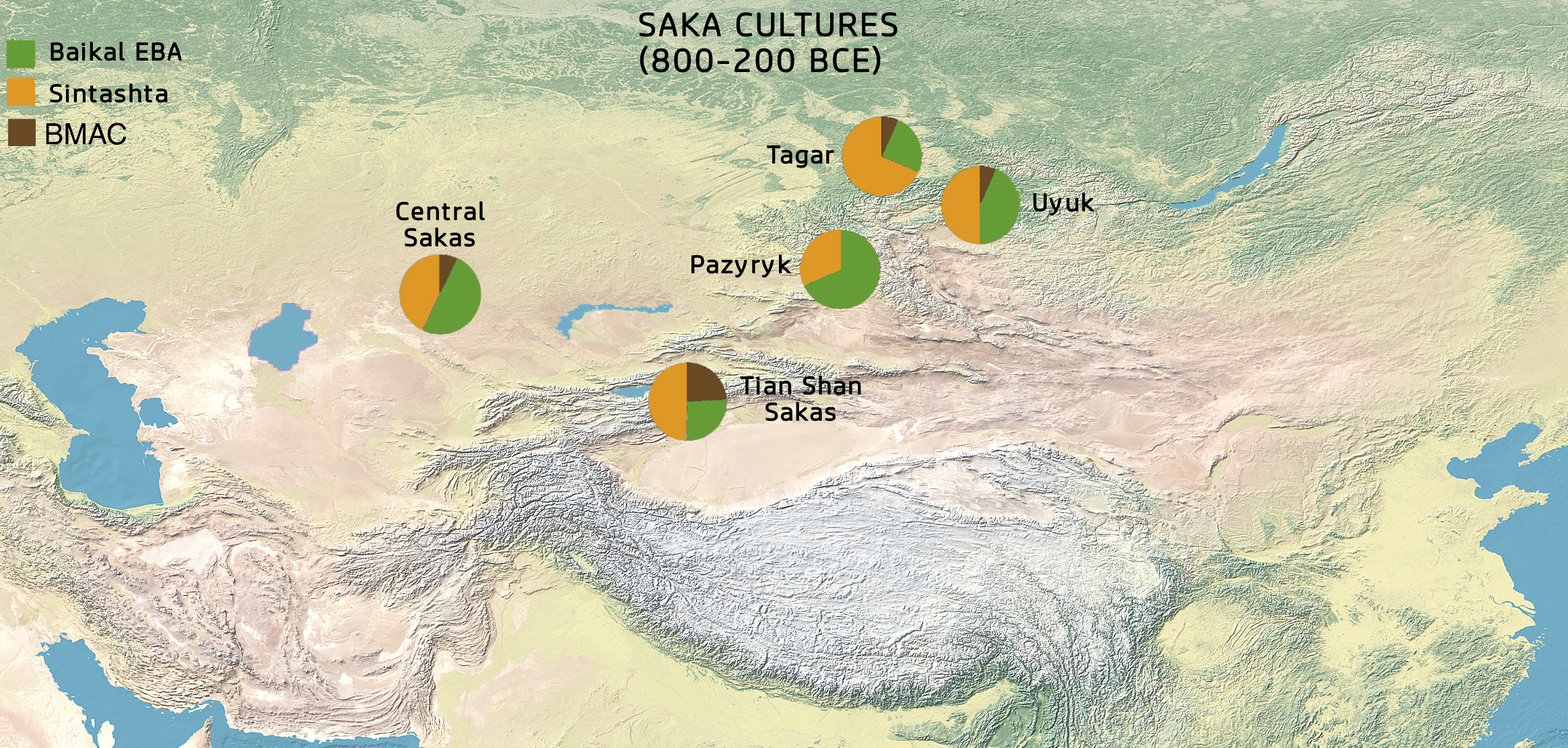
Ancestry of Saka cultures: they combined in almost equal parts Western Eurasian (Sintashta, ) with Ancient Northeast Asian (Baikal EBA, ) ancestry, with a smaller Iranian contribution (BMAC, ).

A 2020 study analyzed the DNA of Chandman fossils (late Uyuk culture), and described them as a mixed Eurasian population, with 50% of their ancestry being derived from the West Eurasian Sintashta culture, and an additional 43% from an East Eurasian population from Lake Baikal (Baikal EBA), Mongolia. Around 7% of their ancestry was related to the Bactria-Margiana Archaeological Complex population of Central Asia, which is closely related to modern-day populations of the Iranian plateau.

The Xiongnu derived an important part of their ancestry from the Chandman culture combined with Eastern Asian Ulaanzuukh/Slab Grave ancestry. A study of the relationship between ethnicity and social status in the Xiongnu Empire suggested that the ancestry of high status individuals among the Xiongnu essentially derived from the Eastern Eurasian Slab Grave culture, while retainers of comparatively lower status had high genetic heterogeneity, representing influxes from the many parts of the Xiongnu Empire, and included a large proportion of Chandman-related individuals.
