= Shilikty =

- Location of Chilikti, with contemporary cultures in the 6th century BCE
- Geographical range: South Siberia
- Dates: 7-6th centuries BCE
- Major sites: 43.549697°N 78.283366°E
- Preceded by: Karasuk culture
- Followed by: Aldy-Bel culture, Pazyryk culture, Tagar culture

Shilikty (Ru: Шиликты курганы), formerly Chilikti, also more precisely Baigetobe Kurgans (Ru: Курганы Байгетобе) in Shilikty Valley, is an archaeological site in eastern Kazakhstan, located in the Chilik river basin. At this site, numerous 8th-6th century BCE Early Saka kurgans were found. Carbon-14 dating suggests a more refined date of 730-690 BCE for the kurgans, and a broad contemporaneity with the Arzhan-2 kurgan in Tuva.

The Kurgans contained vast quantities of precious golden jewelry. Remains of a "golden man" (similar to the Issyk kurgan golden man) were found in 2003, with 4262 gold finds.

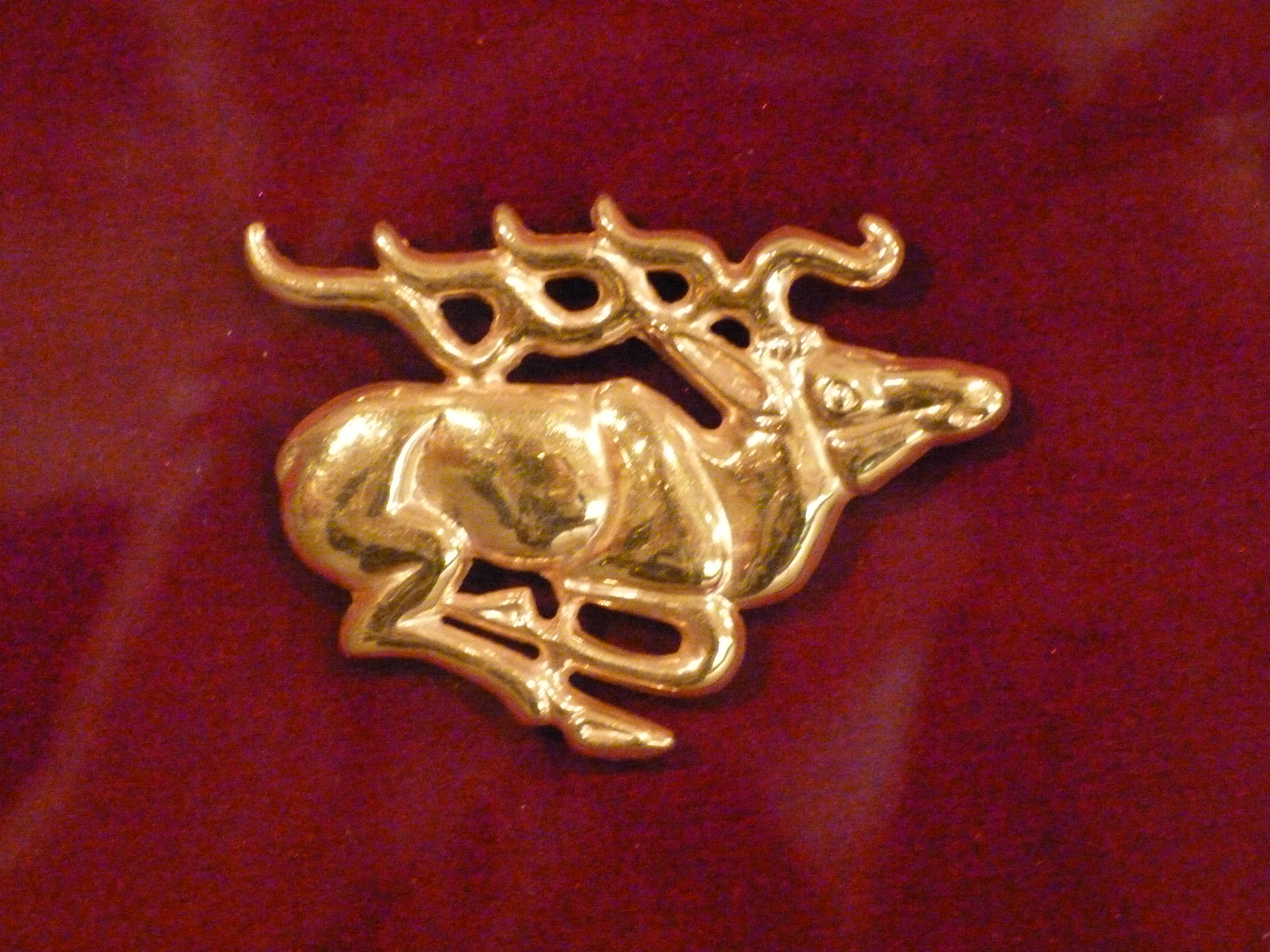
Flying deer, Chilikti (VII. - VI. B. C.) Kazakhstan.

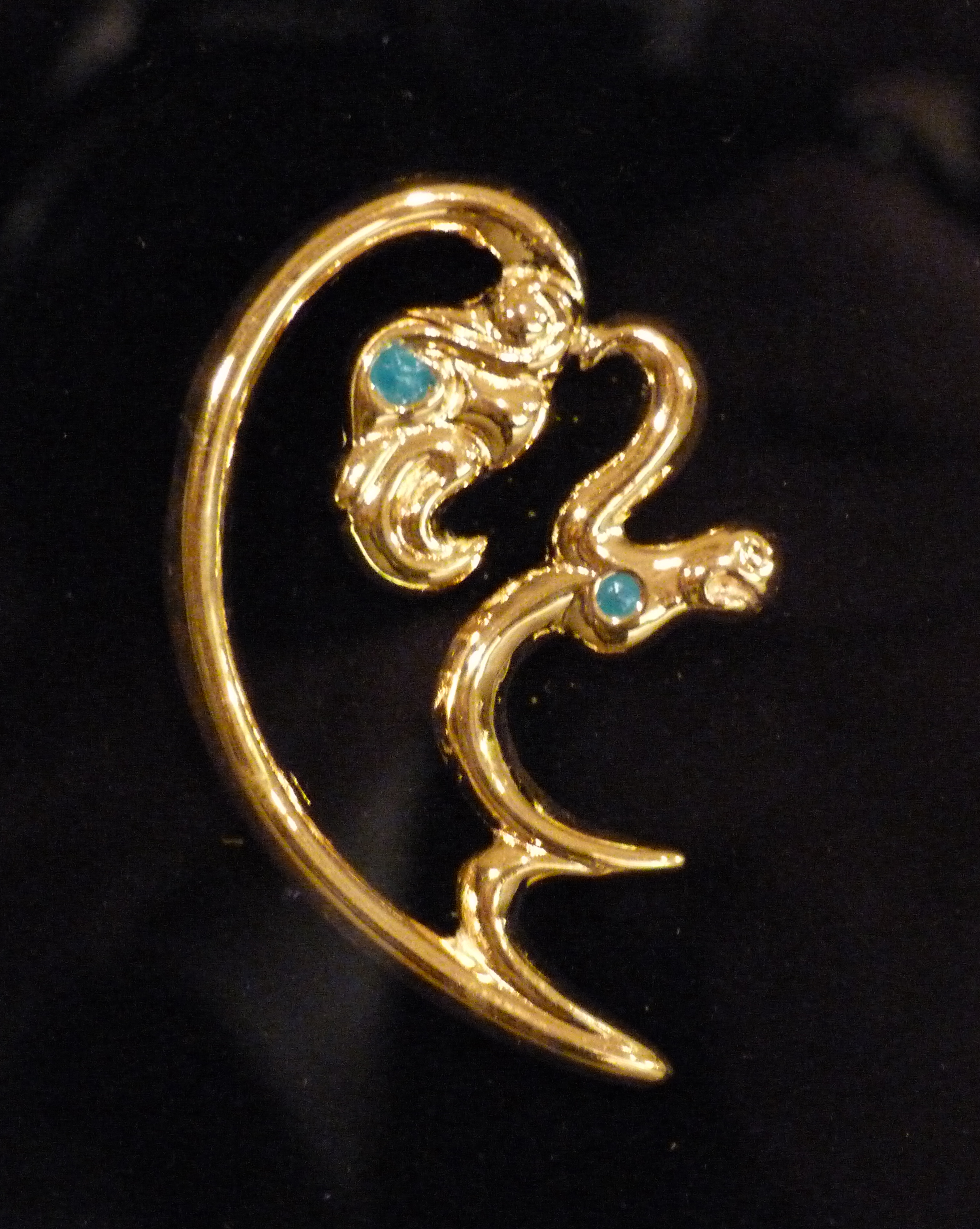
Eagle (Griffin), Chilikti (VII. - VI. B.C.) Kazakhstan.

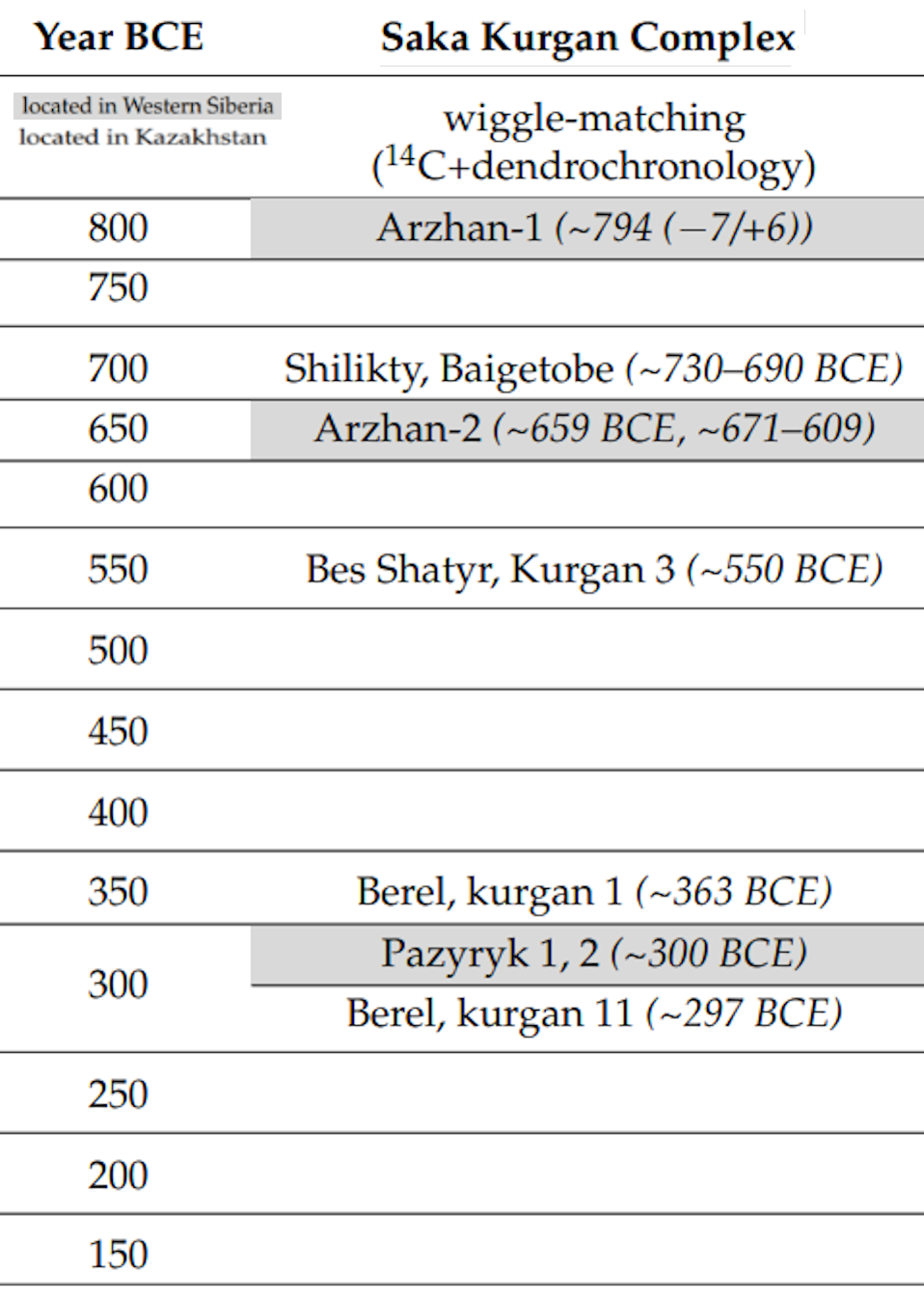
Saka kurgan dates, Shilikty being among the earliest.
