= Arzhan culture =

Archaeologic site in the Tuva Republic

Coordinates: 52.071606°N 93.631836°E

- Location of the early Arzhan culture with the Arzhan burial site, and contemporary cultures in the 9th century BC
- Geographical range: South Siberia
- Dates: 9th to 8th centuries BC
- Preceded by: Karasuk culture
- Followed by: Aldy-Bel culture, Pazyryk culture, Tagar culture

Arzhan (Note: /ɑːrˈʒɑːn/; Russian: Аржа́н, pronounced [ɐrˈʐan]) is a site of early Saka kurgan burials in the Tuva Republic, Russia, some 60 kilometers (40 mi) northwest of Kyzyl. It is on a high plateau traversed by the Uyuk River, a minor tributary of the Yenisei River, in the region of Tuva, 20 km to the southwest of the city of Turan.

The Arzhan culture is considered as forming the initial Scythian period (8th–7th century BC), and precedes the Pazyryk culture. The remains of Arzhan are among the earliest of all known Scythian cultures, which has led to suggestions that it is the origin of the Scythian "Animal Style". It is the first stage of the Saka Uyuk culture.

== Arzhan kurgans ==
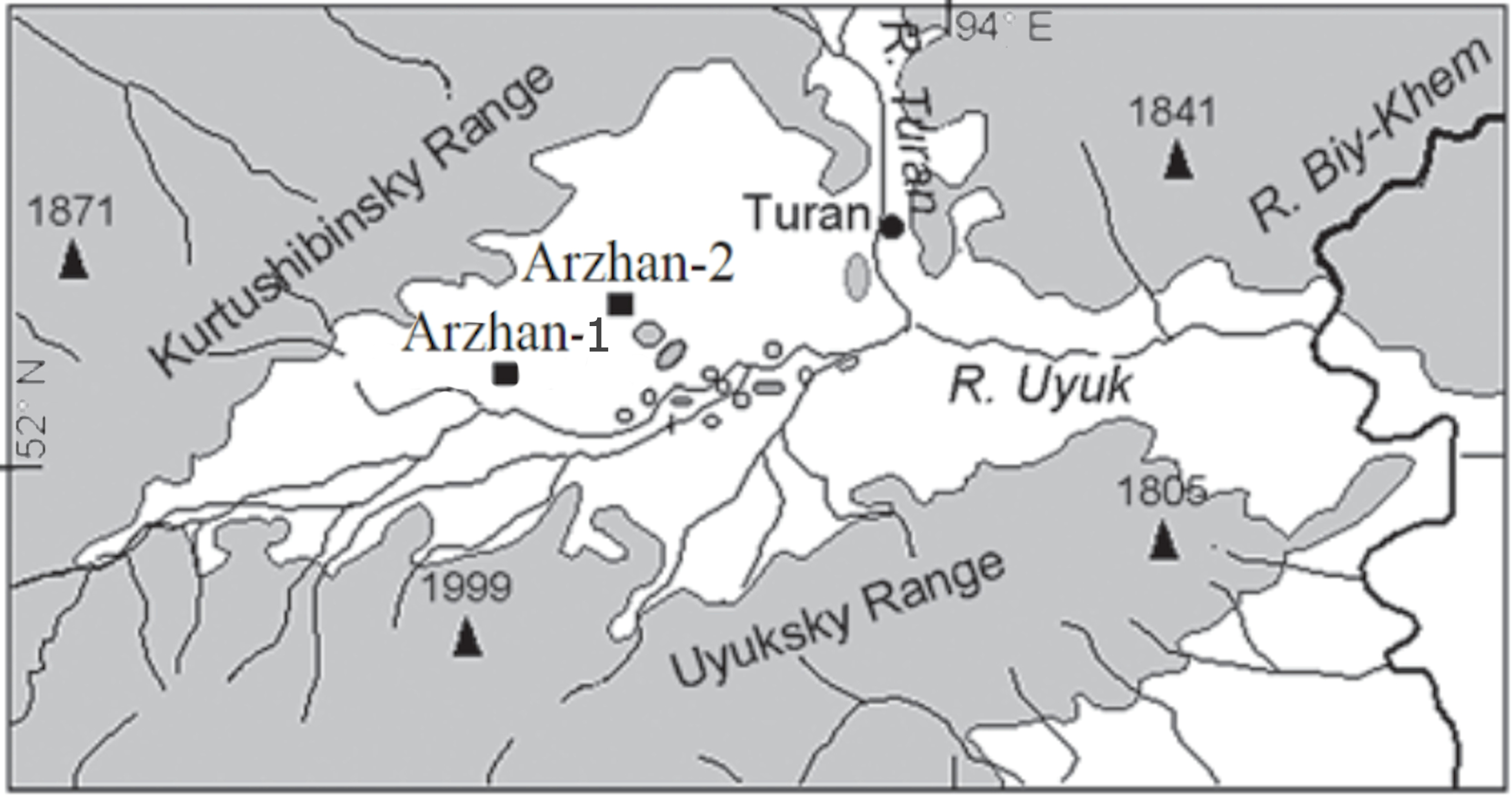
Uyuk Valley, with location of Arzhan 2

The excavations showed burials with rich grave goods including horses and gold artifacts. There are several hundred kurgans.

=== Tunnug 1 (Arzhan 0) 9th century BCE ===
In 2017, the large royal burial mound Tunnug 1 (Arzhan 0), which dates to the same period as Arzhan-1 or slightly earlier (9th century BCE), was investigated by a Russian-Swiss expedition. The wood from the burial was dated through AMS carbon-dating to the 9th century BCE. The Early Saka kurgan itself has yet to be excavated, but a more recent post-Xiongnu Kokel culture (2nd-4th century CE) burial site was discovered and excavated just outside of its southern periphery, and the results were published in 2021.

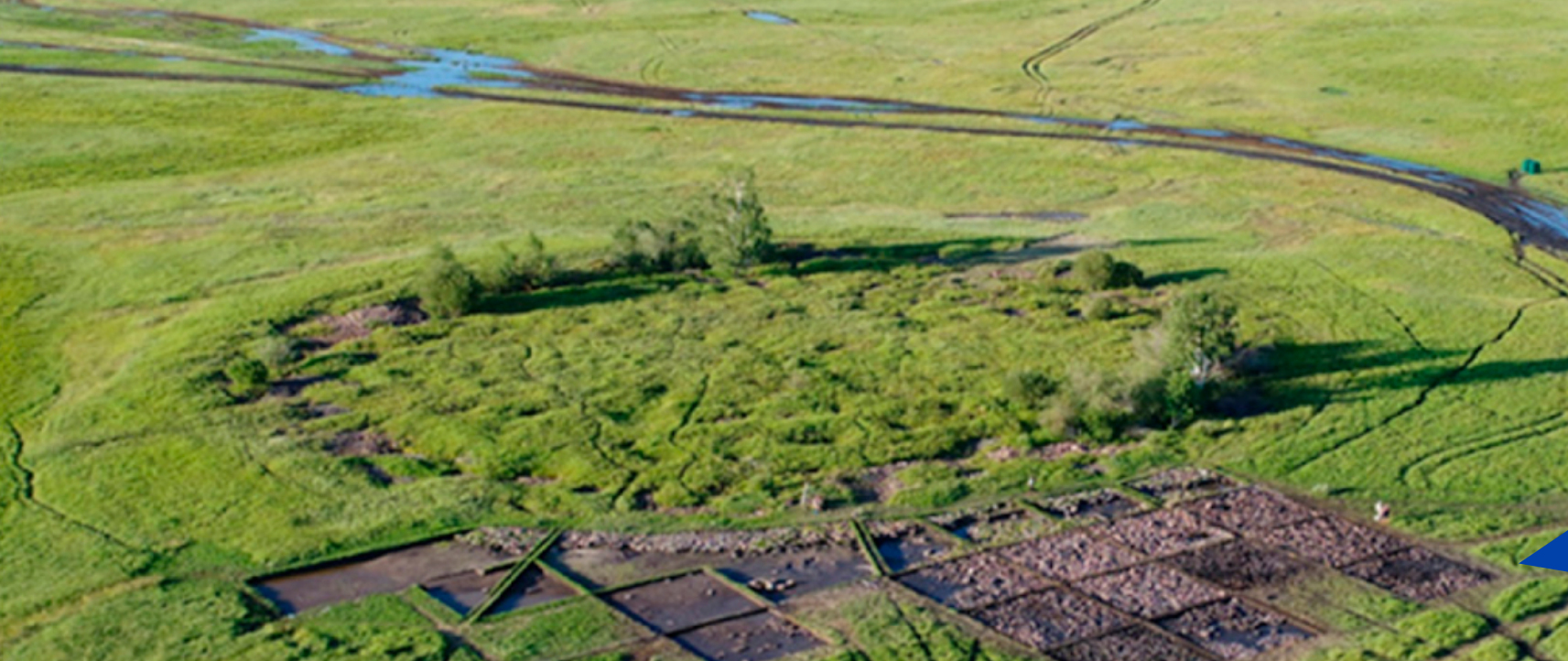
Tunnug 1 Early Saka kurgan (9th century BCE)

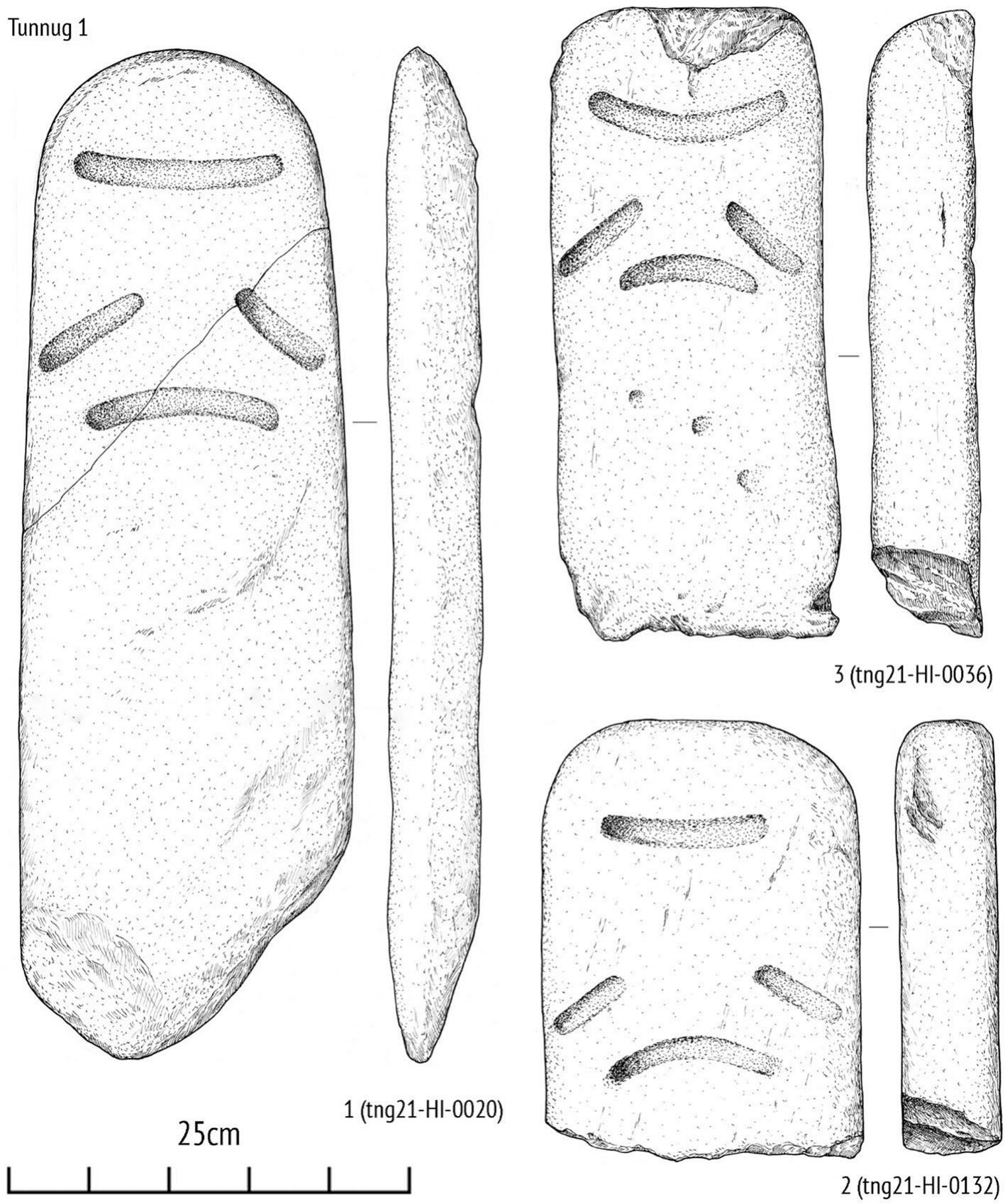
Three stelae

=== Arzhan 1 (c.800 BCE) ===
Arzhan-1 was excavated by M. P. Gryaznov in the 1970s, establishing the origins of Scythian culture in the region in the 10th to 8th centuries BCE: Arzhan-1 was carbon-dated to circa 800 BCE. Further excavations were conducted in 1997 and in 1998-2003 (Arzhan-2). Many of the styles of the artifacts found in Arzhan 1 (such as the animal style images of deer, boar, and panther) soon propagated to the west, probably following a migration mouvement from the east to the west in the 9th-7th centuries BCE, and ultimately reaching European Scythia and influencing artistic styles there.

Deer stones, highly decorated anthropomorphic stones dated to 1300 — 700 BCE, are associated with the burials at Arzhan 1 and Arzhan 2. The motif of the curled feline from Arzhan 1 also appears in some of the Deer stones.

The bronze weapons discovered in the tomb are quite similar to those of the late Karasuk culture. These early objects suggest a datation to circa 800 BCE (late 9th, early 8th centuries). They suggest close relations with the Novocherkassk culture north of the Black Sea. There are also connections with the Bainov phase of the Tagar culture and the early Majemir culture of the Altai.

"Arzhan 1" is the earliest known example of the "Scythian triad", defined by 1) characteristic horse harnesses 2) Scythian-style weaponry and 3) characteristic Scythian animal art.

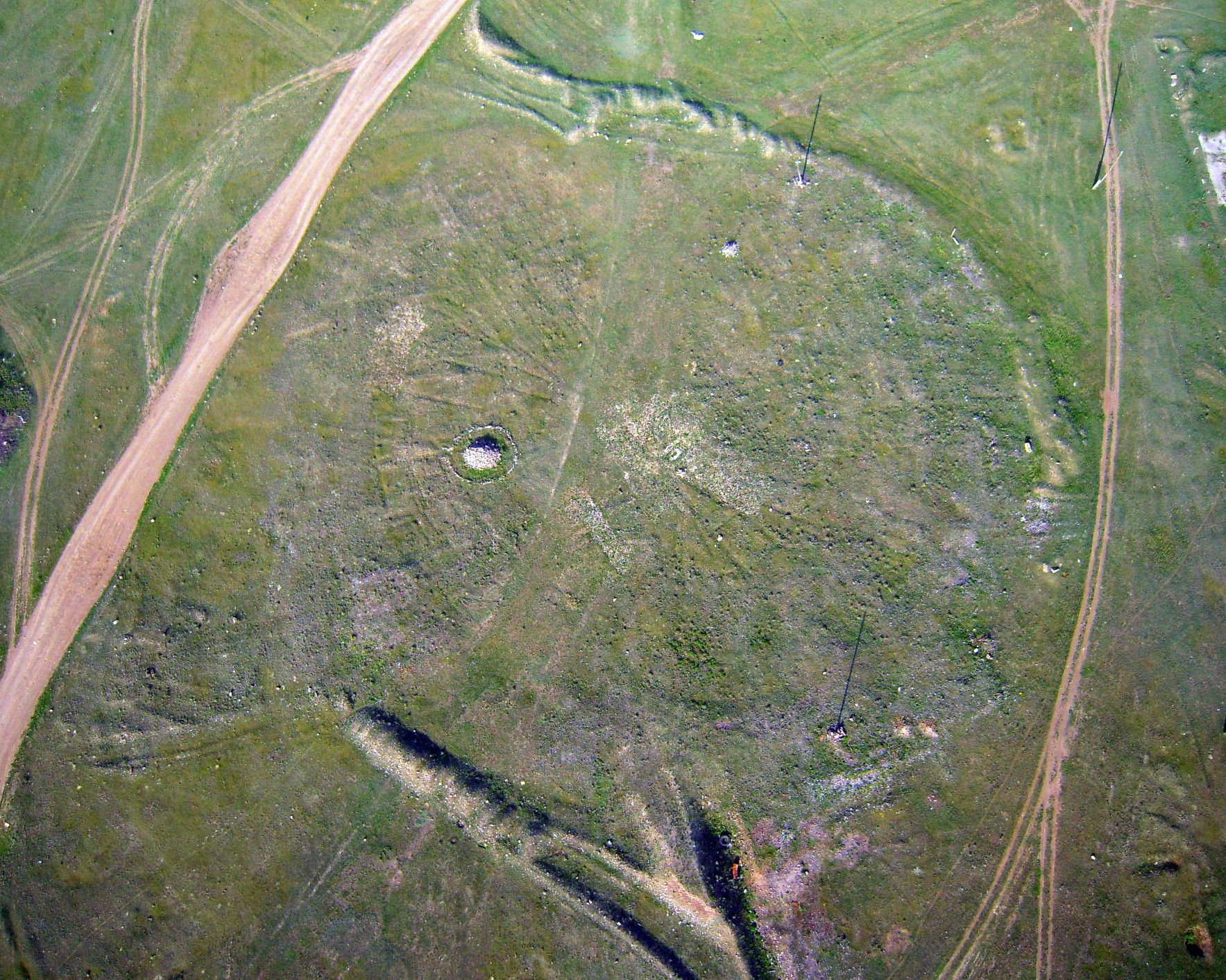
Arzhan-1, dated to circa 800 BCE, partly looted in Antiquity

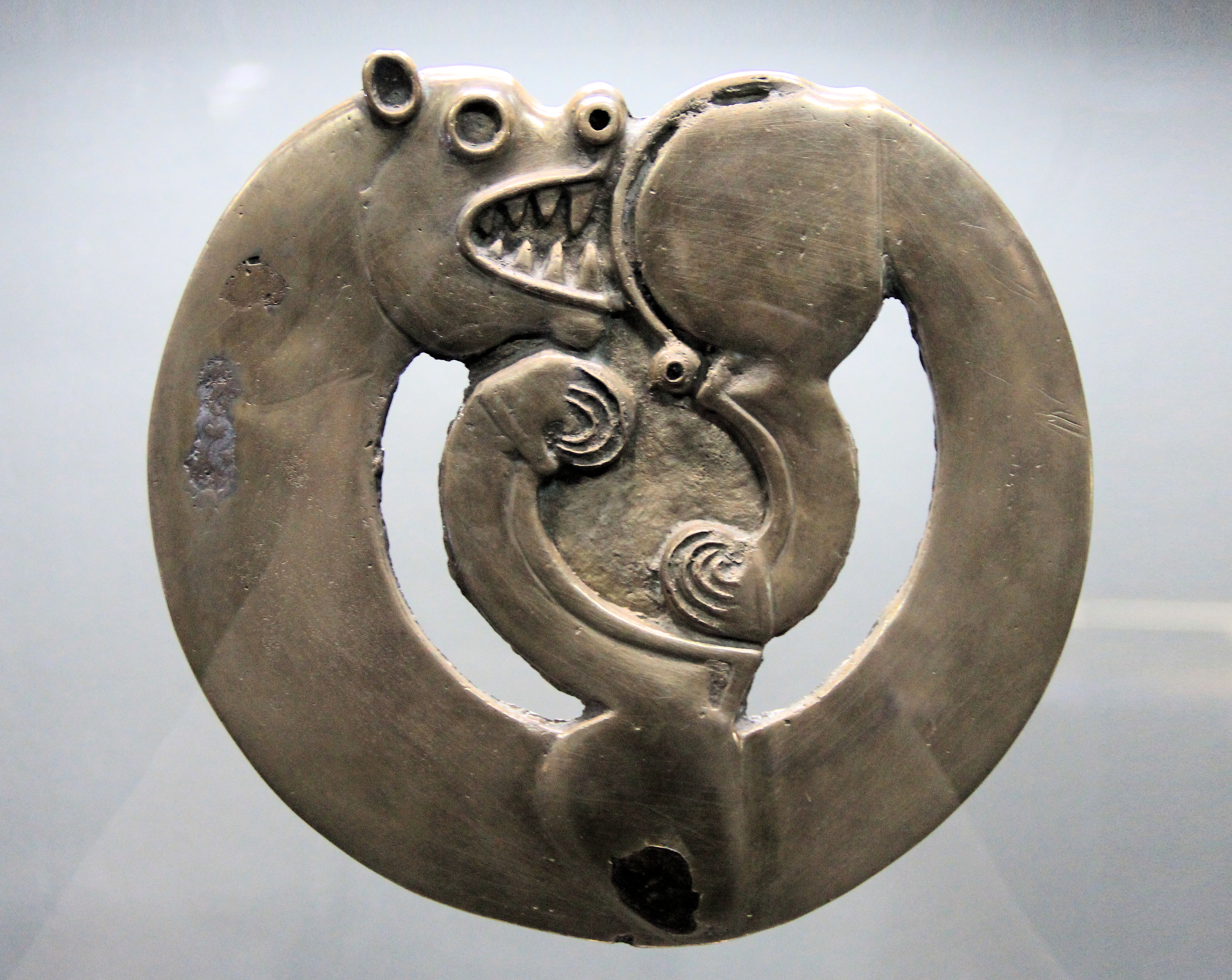
Curled-up feline animal from Arzhan-1, circa 800 BCE. This is the earliest known of a common animal art design.

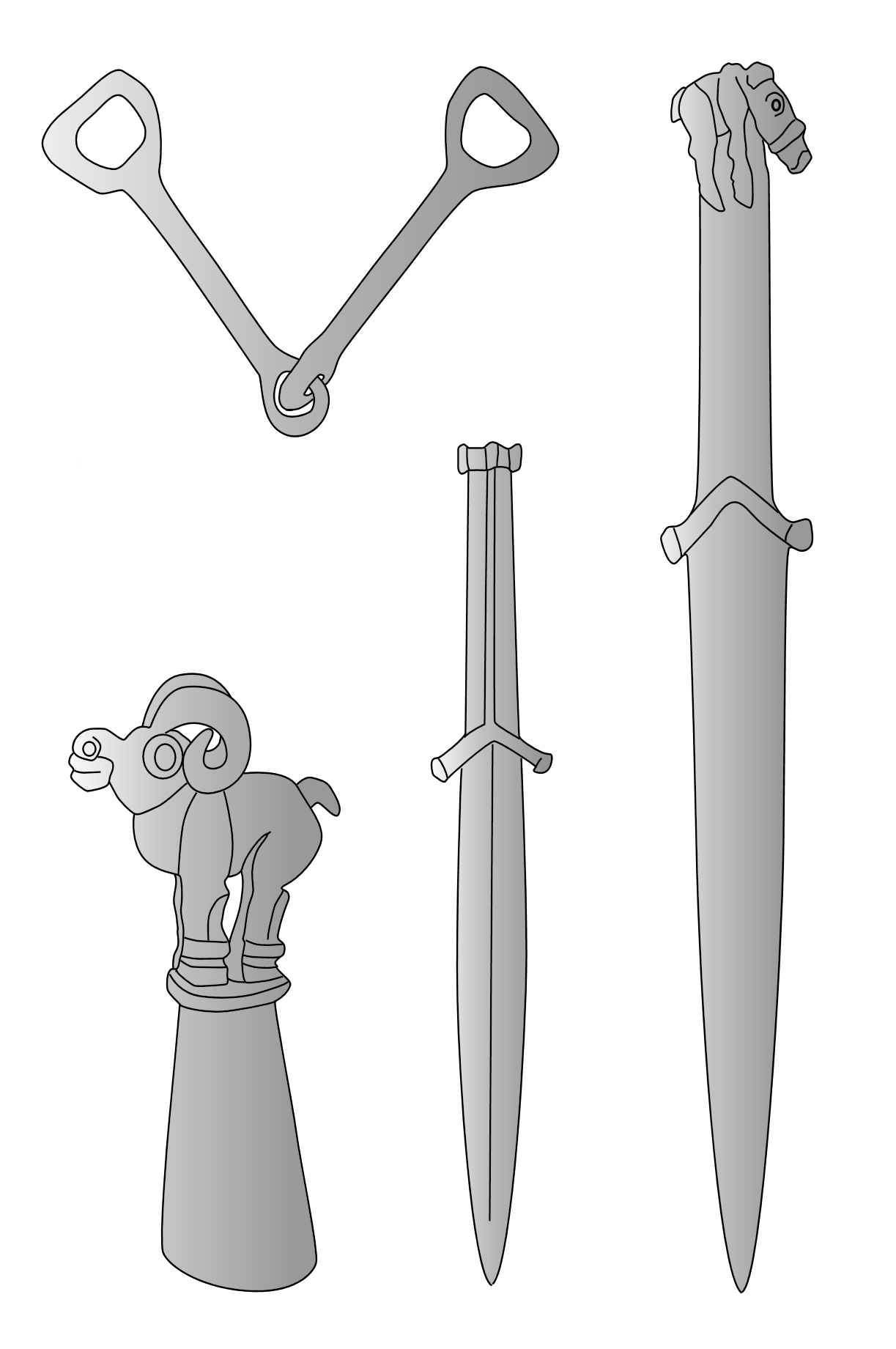
Arzhan I bronze artifacts: horsebit with horseshoe shape, decorative pole cover and daggers. The dagger is close to Tagar culture types.

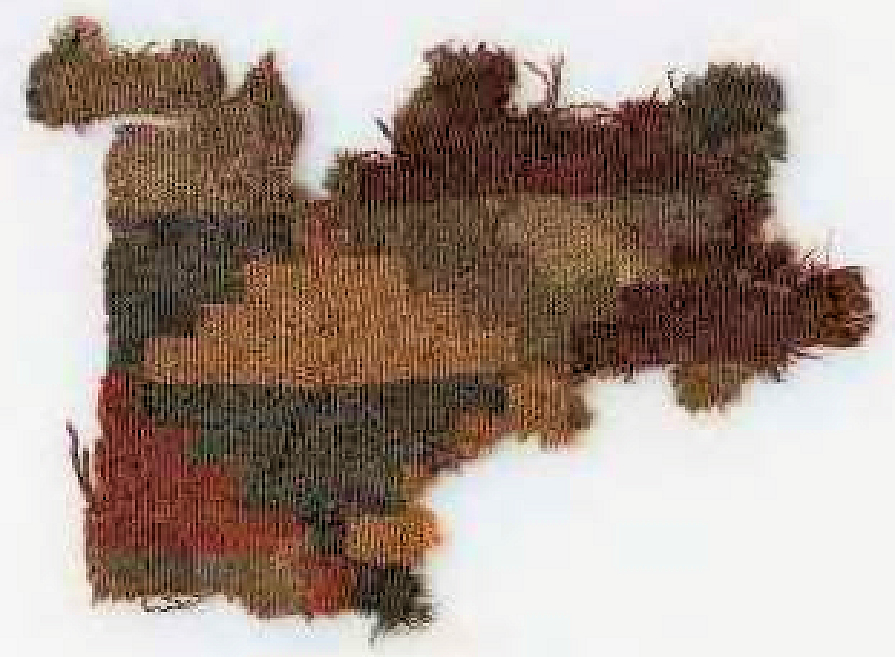
Arzhan 1 (Grave 1 of King and Queen) textile with geometric design.

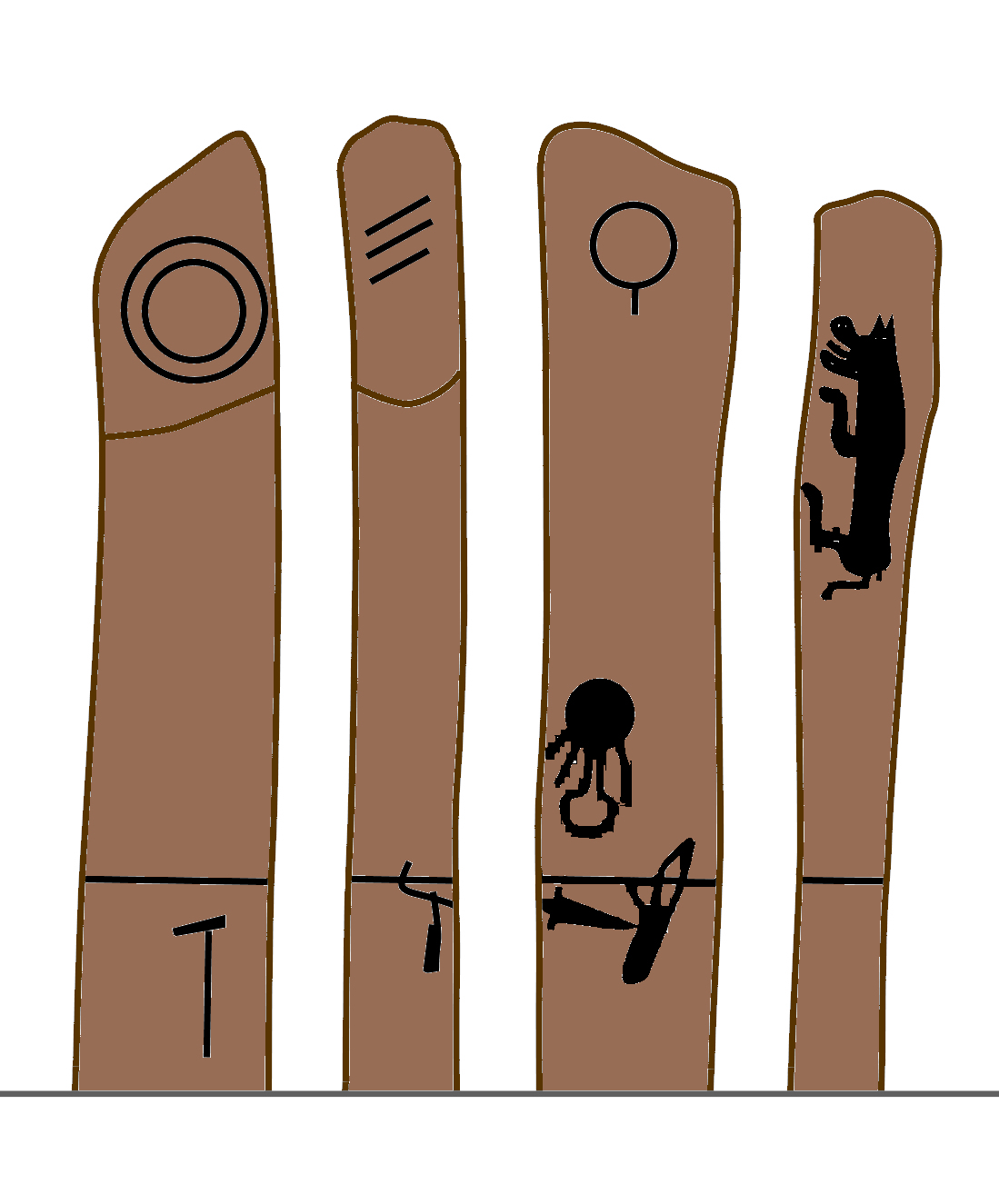
8th century BCE deerstone, Arzhan-1. State Hermitage Museum, St Petersburg, 2830/23.

=== Arzhan 2 (650-600 BCE) ===
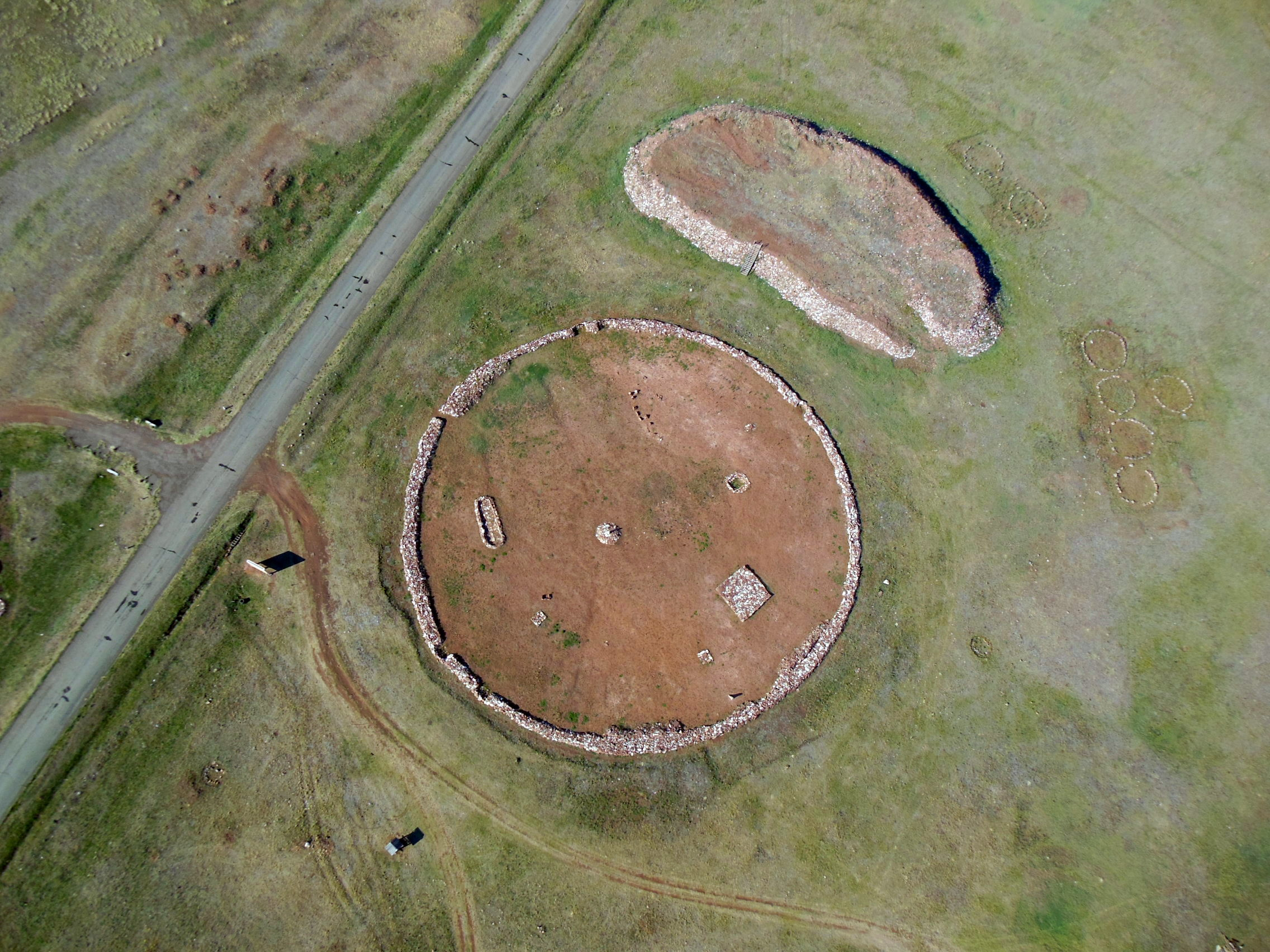
Arzhan 2 kurgan (7th-6th centuries BC, associated with the Aldy-Bel culture).

Arzhan-2 turned out to be an undisturbed burial. It has been carbon-dated to circa 650-600 BCE (middle to end of the 7th century BCE). The builders created two central pits that were fake graves to throw off looters, and the main burial was 20 meters off-center. It was first explored by a joint German and Russian archaeological expedition from 2000 to 2004. They found the royal couple, sixteen murdered attendants, and 9,300 objects. 5,700 of these artifacts were made of gold, weighing a Siberian record-breaking twenty kilograms. The male, who researchers guess was some sort of king, wore a golden torc, a jacket decorated with 2,500 golden panther figurines, a gold-encrusted dagger on a belt, trousers sewn with golden beads, and gold-cuffed boots. The woman wore a red cloak that was also covered in 2,500 golden panther figurines, as well as a golden-hilted iron dagger, a gold comb, and a wooden ladle with a golden handle. The couple was buried together, suggesting that the woman was killed to keep the king company in the afterlife. The tomb also had thousands of beads, including over four hundred made of Baltic amber.

The Arzhan-2 kurgan was found to be broadly contemporaneous with the Early Saka Shilikti kurgans in eastern Kazakhstan.

Several petroglyphs with designs similar to those of Deer stones, such as individuals with weapons, horse charriots, deer or shields were discovered at the eastern side of the kurgan.

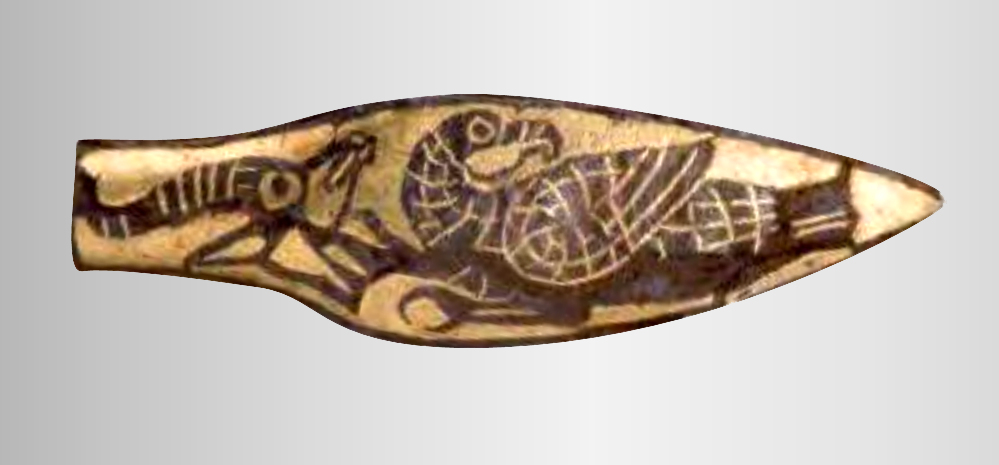
Arrowhead with gold inlays, Arzhan-2, 7th century BCE.

Genetic and anthropomorphic analysis was made on the King and the Queen from the central burial of Arzhan-2. They both display typical Saka genetic characteristics, being a fairly balanced combination of Western Steppe ancestry (Sintashta, Srubnaya, Andronovo type), and Eastern Eurasian ancestry (Khövsgöl LBA type, from northern Mongolia), with a small contribution of BMAC-type ancestry. Forensic reconstructions were made at the Laboratory of Anthropological Reconstruction of the Institute of Ethnology and Anthropology of the Russian Academy of Sciences by anthropologists Drs E.V. Veselovskaya and R.M. Galeev. They displayed a combination of "Caucasoid" and "Mongoloid" features, the Queen having especially high and prominent cheekbones.

Etched carnelian beads, a technology originally developed in India in the 3rd millennium BCE, and probably manufactured in Iran or Central Asia where found in the tomb of Arzhan-2, suggesting trade exchanges with the south.

Gold inlays to decorate iron and bronze objects were used by the nomads of Eurasia from the 7th century BCE, starting with the battle axe and the arrowheads found at Arzhan-2. This technique continued to be in use from the 6th to the 4th century CE in a much wider area, as with the gold-inlaid knife handle of the Shibe barrow in Southern Siberia, or the gold-inlaid plates of the Tasmola culture, as far as the southern Urals in the Late-Sauromatian Filippovka kurgans.

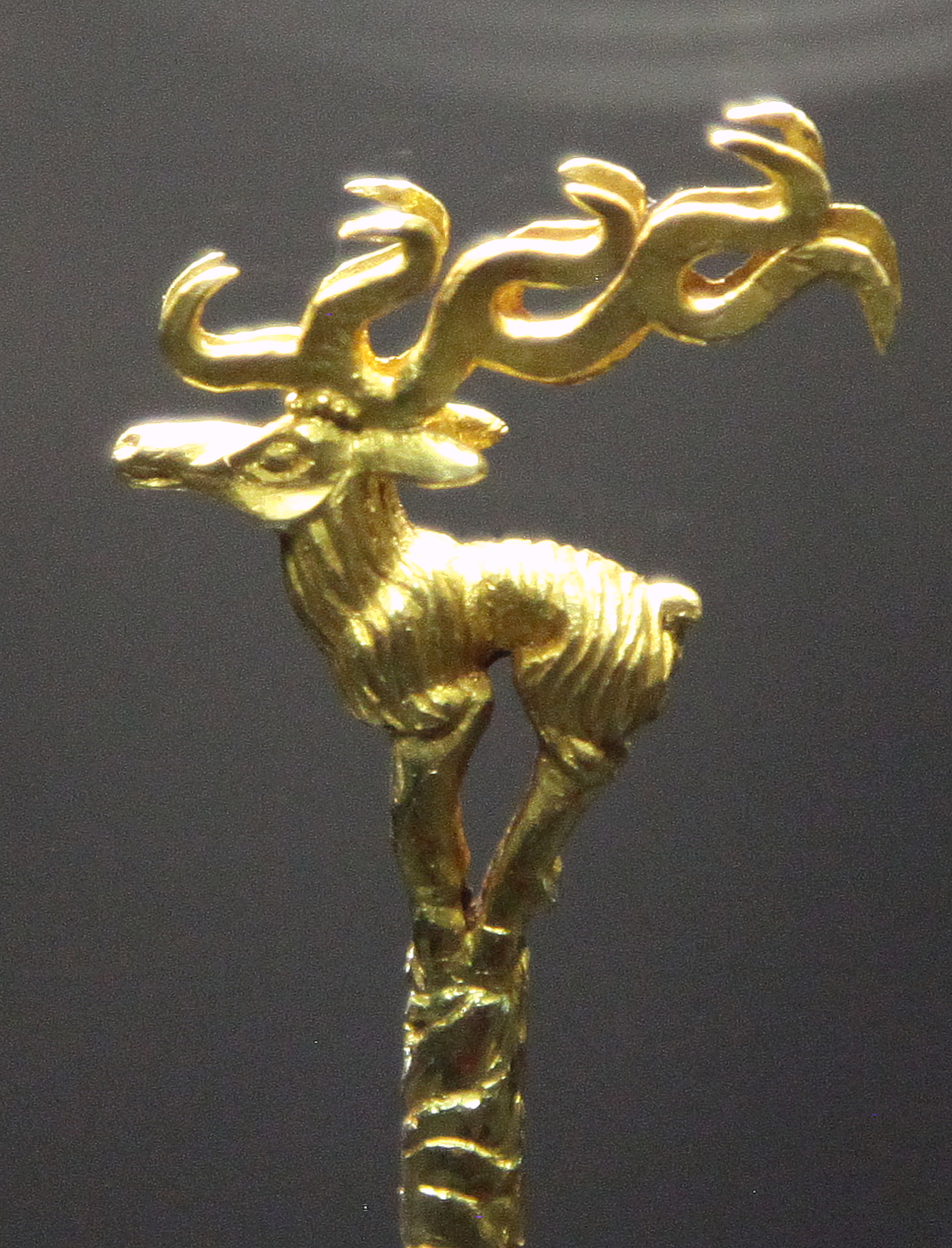
"Animal style" deer, (7-6th century BC) Tuva.

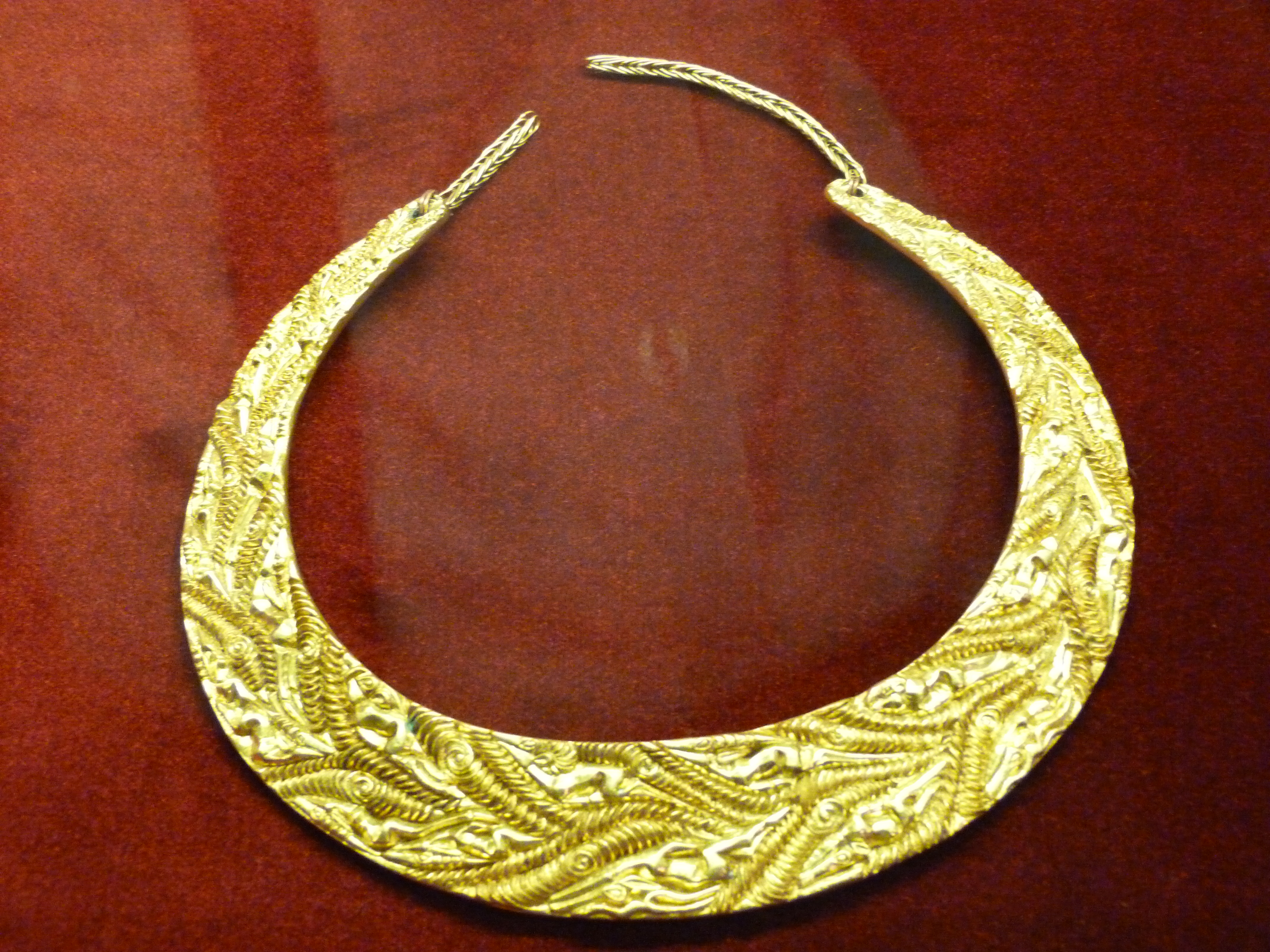
Pectoral plate, from burial mound Arzhan (7-6th century BC) Tuva.

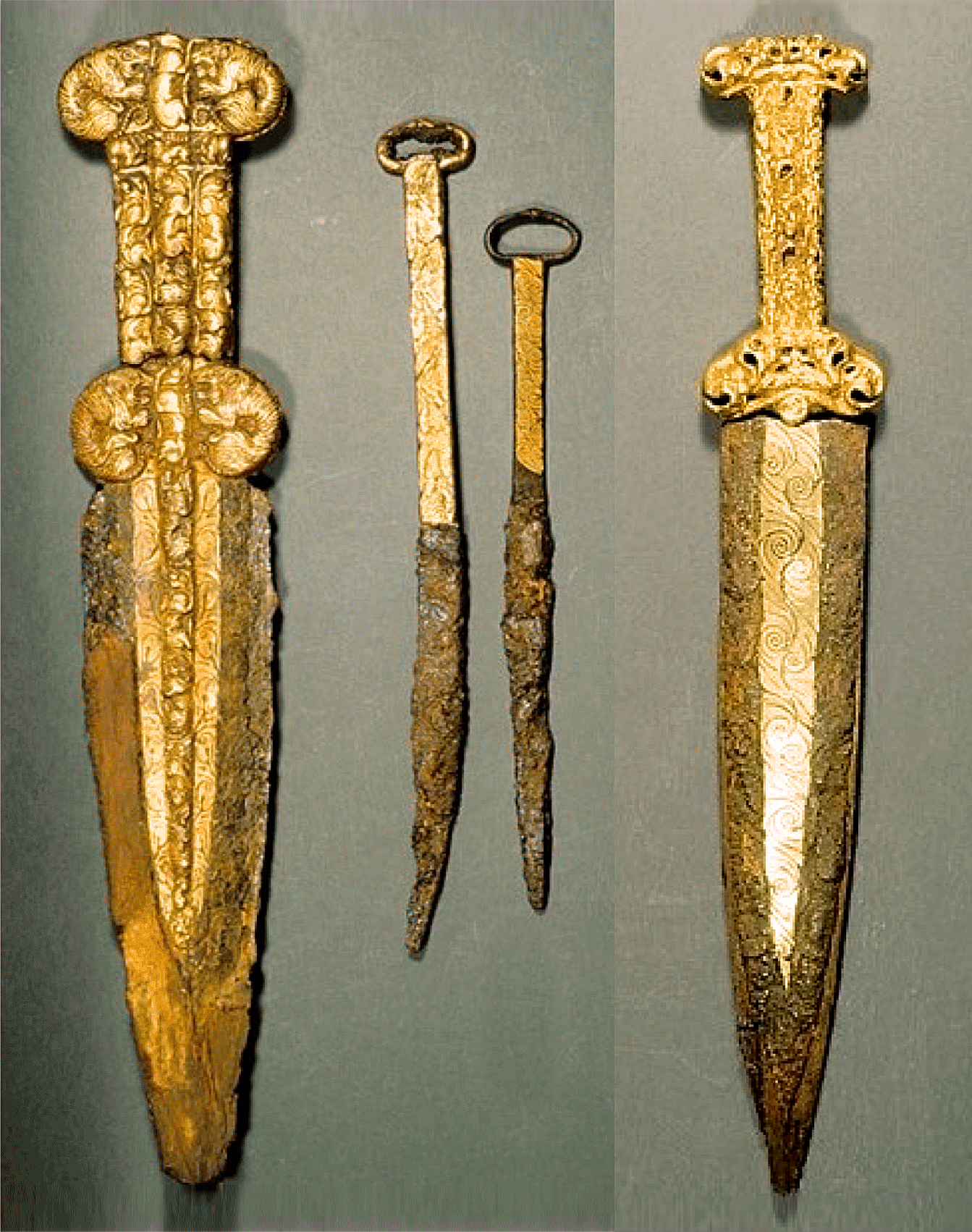
Princely akinak (daggers). Burial mound Arzhan (7-6th century BC) Tuva.

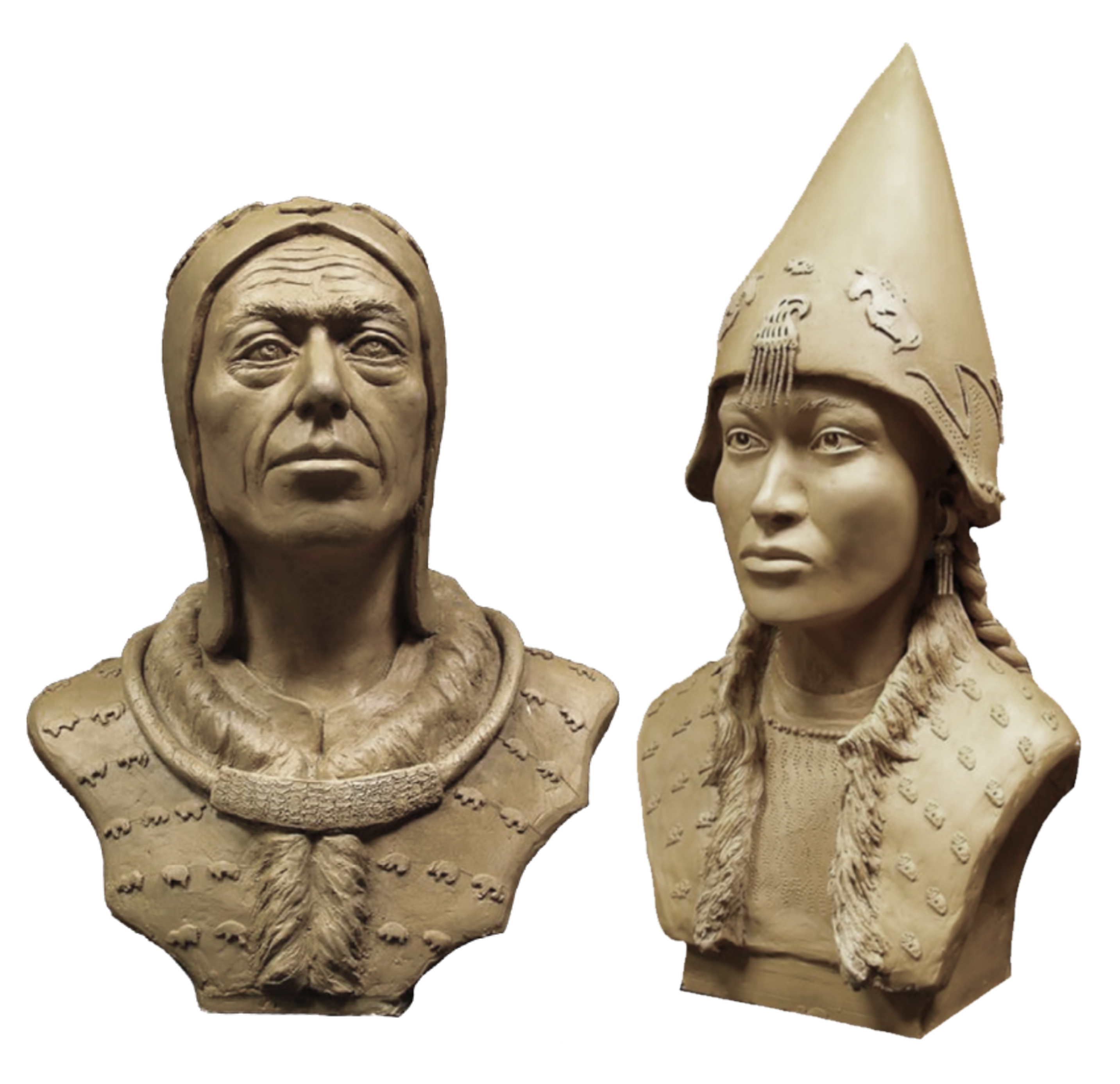
Forensic reconstruction of the King and Queen of Arzhan-2, in their burial costumes

=== Chinge-Tey I ===
Chinge-Tey I represents the burial of an 'elite' individual of the Arzhan Aldy-Bel culture (7th − 6th centuries BC) of the early Scythian period. The remains belonged to a 20 to 25 year- old male. The Chinge-Tey I site is located at a distance of twenty kilometers to the Arzhan 2 site. The burial also included gold jewelry, weapons, horse gear, and burial garments. The 'elite' individual was buried with an unusual long robe as well as with a unique glass bowl, which was likely of Assyrian origin. Some of the used decorative images (animal style) seem to have originated in the artistic tradition of Okunevo culture. Eight graves of warriors were found at the periphery of the complex, surrounding the 'elite' burial.

== Significance ==
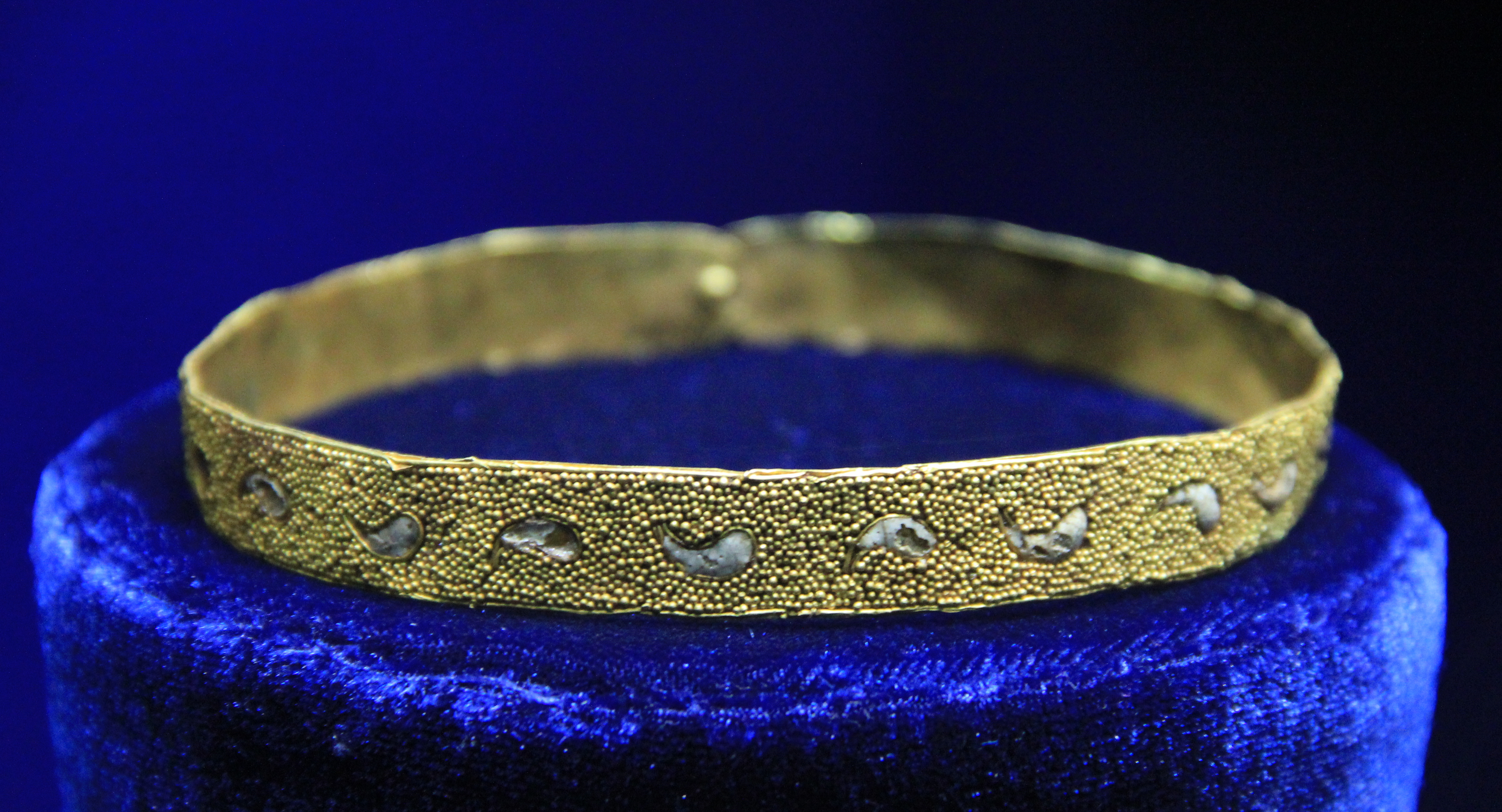
Arzhan-2 gold bracelet, Tuva National Museum.

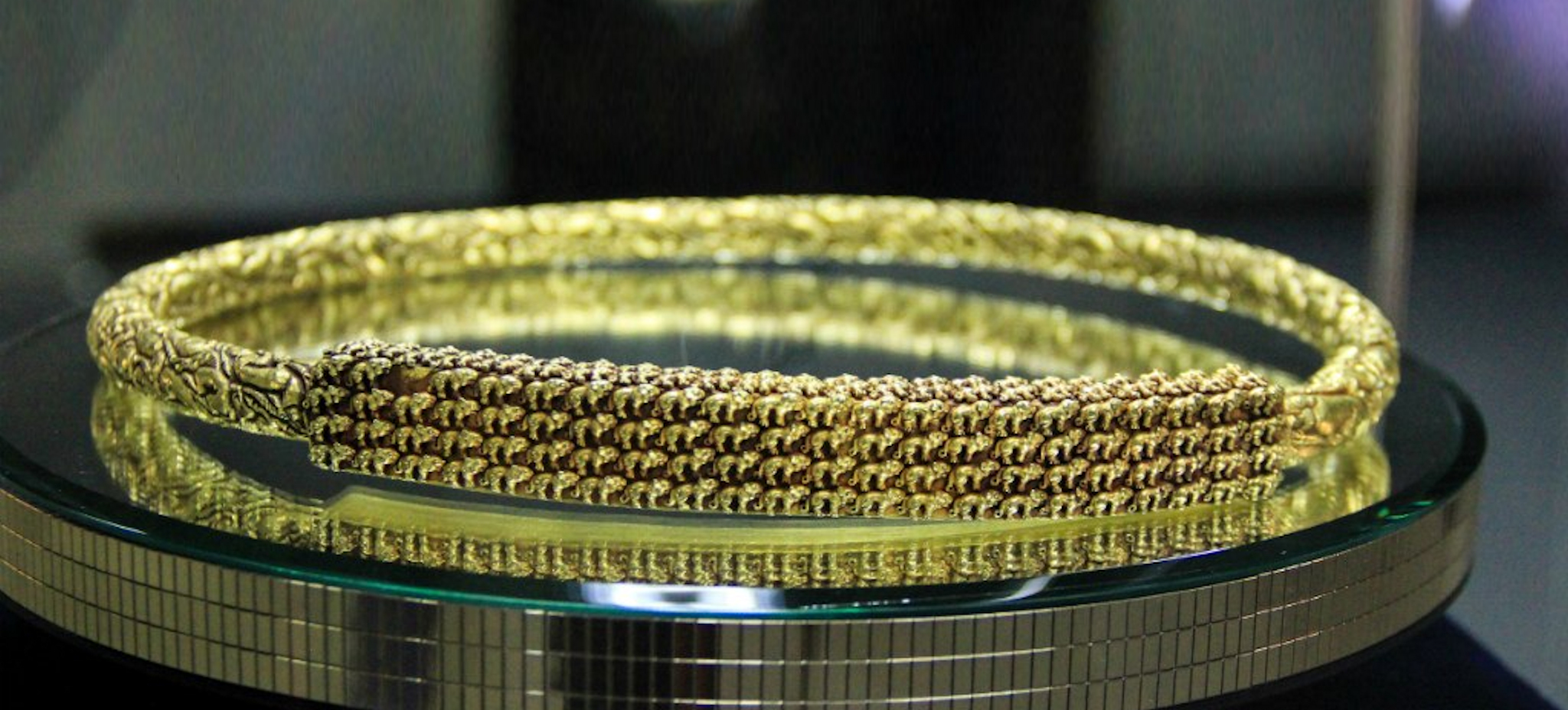
Arzhan-2 gold torque, Tuva National Museum. It weighs 1.5 kilograms.

Arzhan has been a key element in archaeological evidence that now tends to suggest that the origins of Scythian culture, characterized by its kurgan burial mounds and its Animal style of the 1st millennium BC, are to be found among Eastern Scythians rather than their Western counterparts: eastern kurgans are older than western ones (such as the Altaic kurgan Arzhan 1 in Tuva), and elements of the Animal style are first attested in areas of the Yenisei river and modern-day China in the 10th century BCE. The rapid spread of Scythian culture, from the Eastern Scythians to the Western Scythians, is also confirmed by significant east-to-west gene flow across the steppes during the 1st millennium BC.

== Genetics ==
In 2019, a genetic study of remains from the Aldy-Bel culture was published in Human Genetics. The authors determined the paternal haplogroups of 11 Aldy Bel males. 9 out of 11 samples (82%) were found to be carriers of the West Eurasian haplogroup R1a, while 2 samples (18%) belonged to the East Eurasian haplogroups Q-L54 and N-M231.

The authors also analyzed the maternal haplogroups of 26 Siberian Scythian remains from Arzhan. 50% of the remains carried an East Eurasian haplogroup including C, D, F and G, while 50% carried West Eurasian haplogroups H, U, or T. In contrast to the paternal lineages, the maternal lineages were extremely diverse. The most common lineages were variants of haplogroup C4.

Significant paternal genetic differences were found between the Eastern Scythians and the Scythians of the Pontic-Caspian steppe. The two groups were of completely different paternal origins, with almost no paternal gene flow between them. On the other hand, there is strong evidence of shared maternal DNA between Scythian cultures, indicating maternal geneflow from East Euraisa to West Eurasia.

Another analysis of population ancestry suggested that Aldy Bel Scythians were of roughly 60% West Eurasian ancestry and 40% East Eurasian ancestry.

In 2025, the genome of an 'elite' burial in the Chinge-Tey I site was analyzed for the first time. The individual was found to be closely related to the Tasmola culture in Eastern and Central Kazakhstan, as well as to the earlier Okunevo culture. The newly sequenced Chinge-Tey I individual belonged to the Y-haplogroup Q1b1 (Q-L476) and the mt-haplogroup G2a.

== See also ==
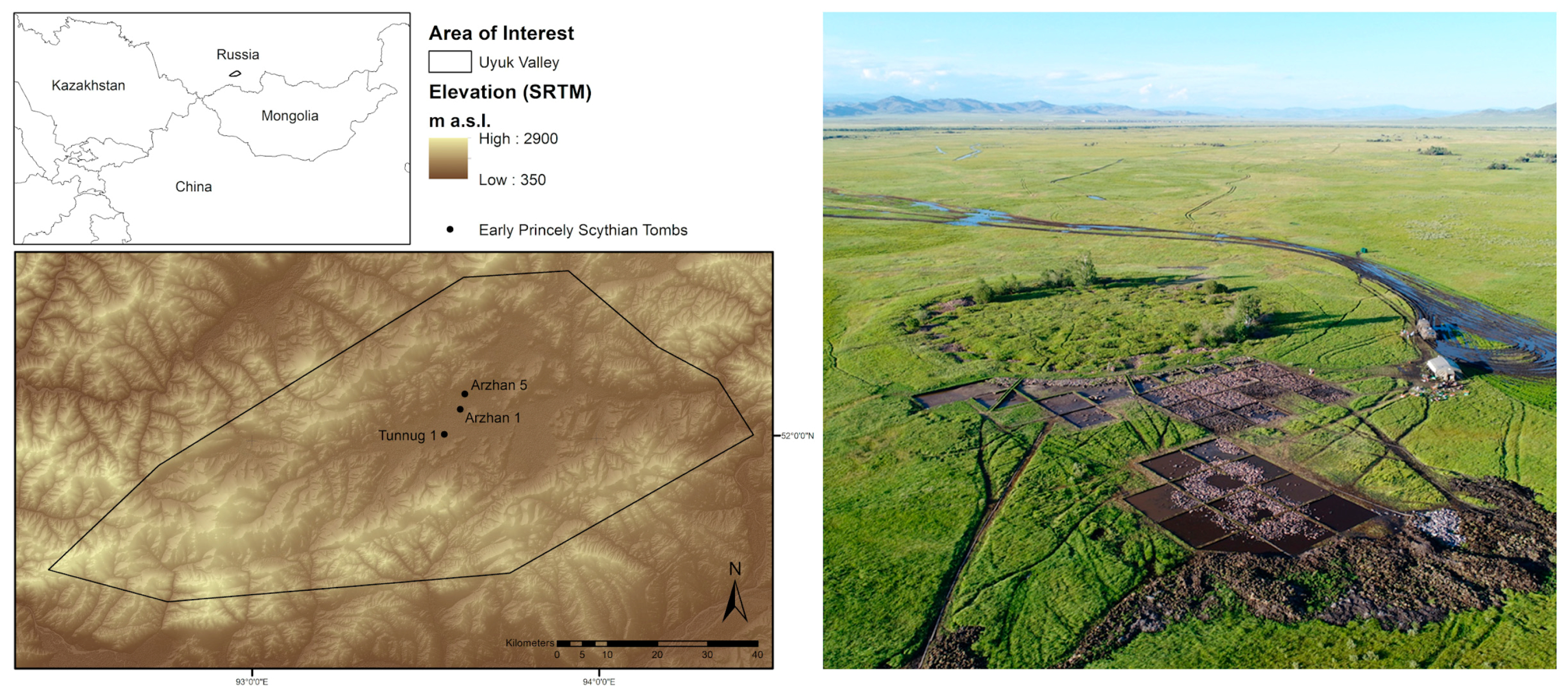
Uyuk Valley with royal Scythian burial mounds. Aerial view of the burial mound Tunnug 1 (looking northeast). The central circular kurgan has yet to be excavated, but a Kokel culture burial site was recently excavated just outside of its southern periphery (here visible with its dark square excavation areas).

- Aldy-Bel culture
- Srubna culture
- Andronovo culture
- Karasuk culture
