= Tuva National Museum =

National museum of Tuva, Russia

Coordinates: 51.7190°N 94.4294°E

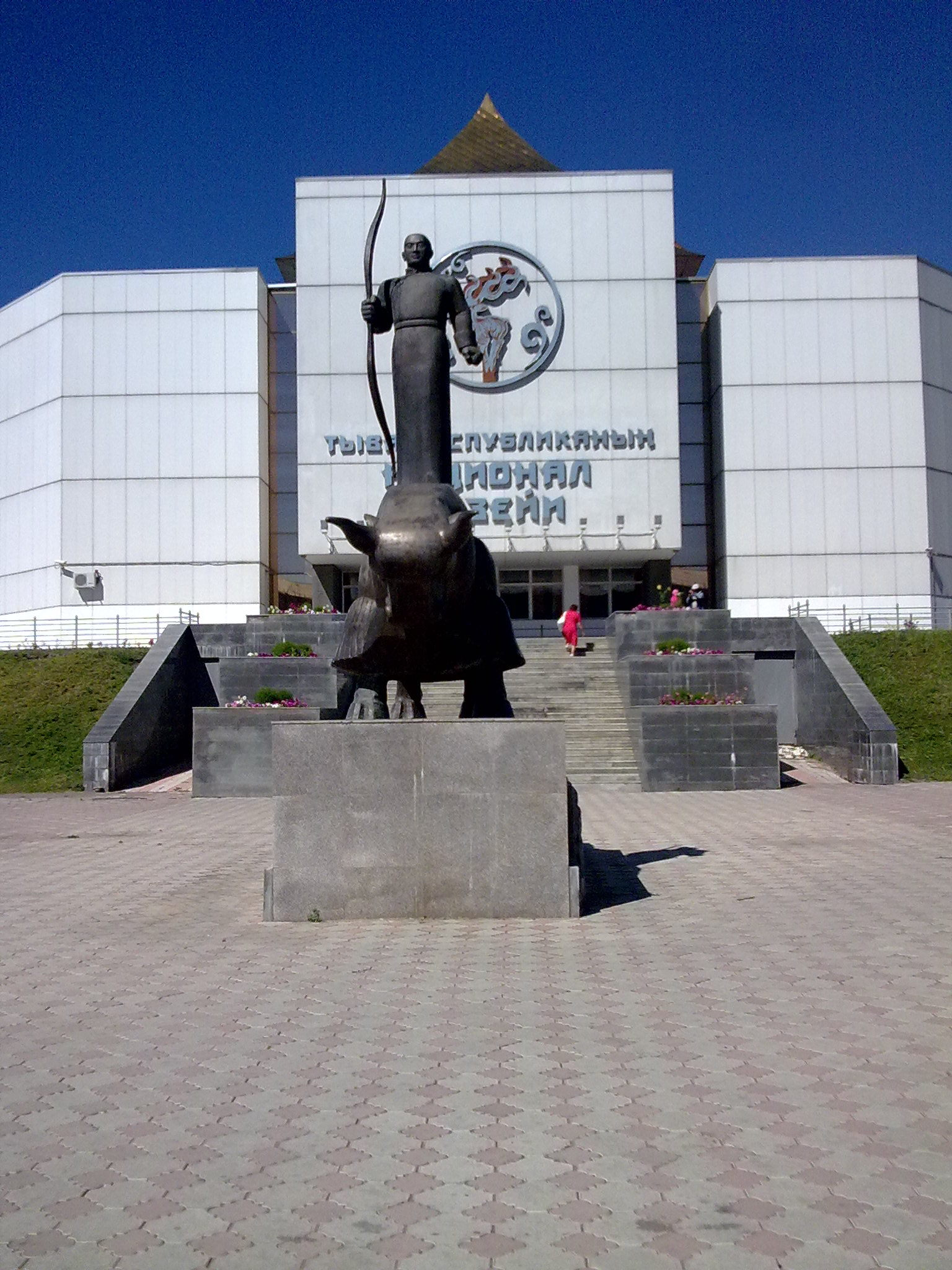
Tuva National Museum, Kyzyl

Tuva National Museum is a museum of the Tuva Republic, located in the city of Kyzyl. The museum has collections of Saka art, particularly artifact from the Arzhan kurgan. The museum's first director was V. P. Yermolaev (1892–1982).

== Gallery ==
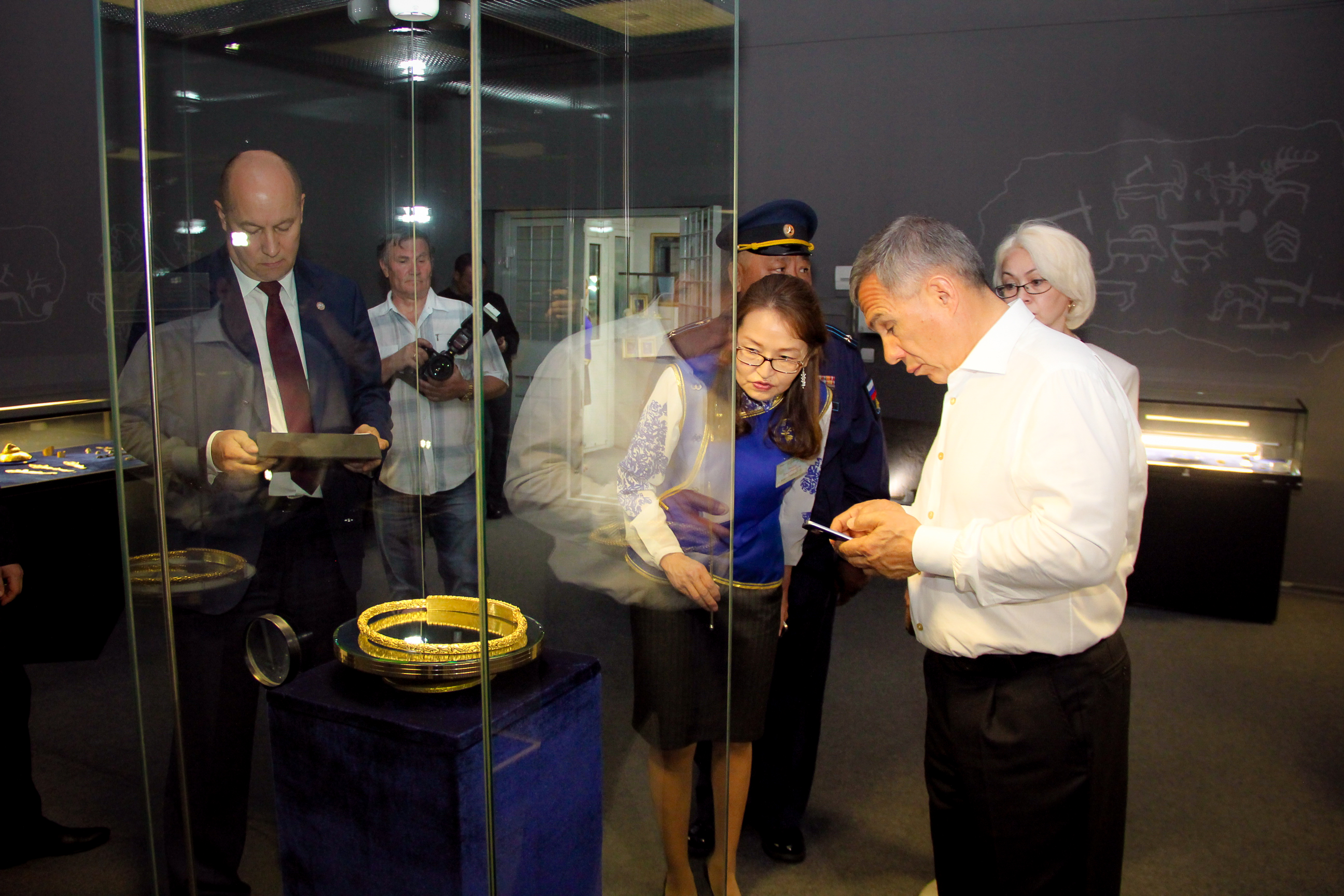
Tuva National Museum

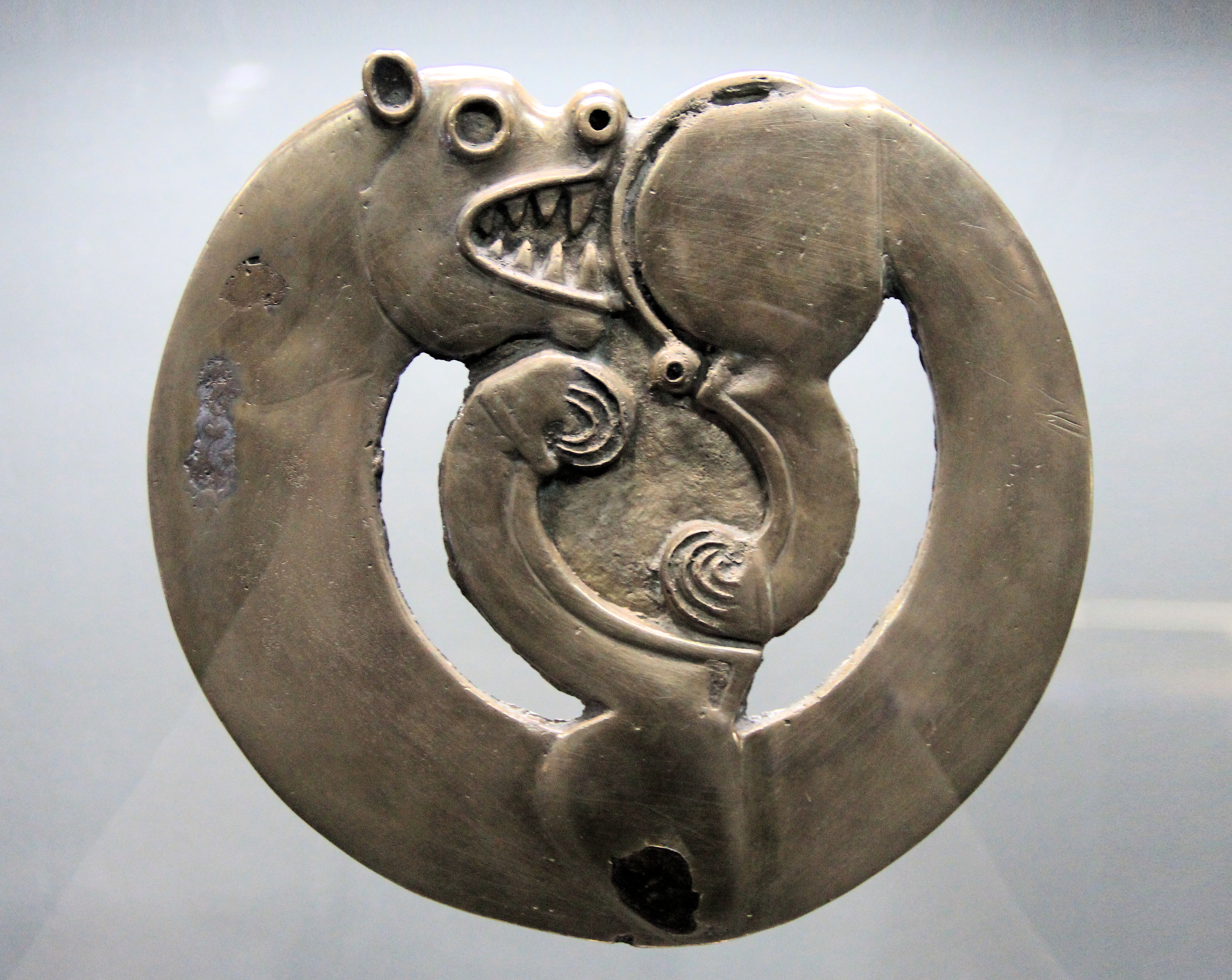
Arzhan kurgan animal ring

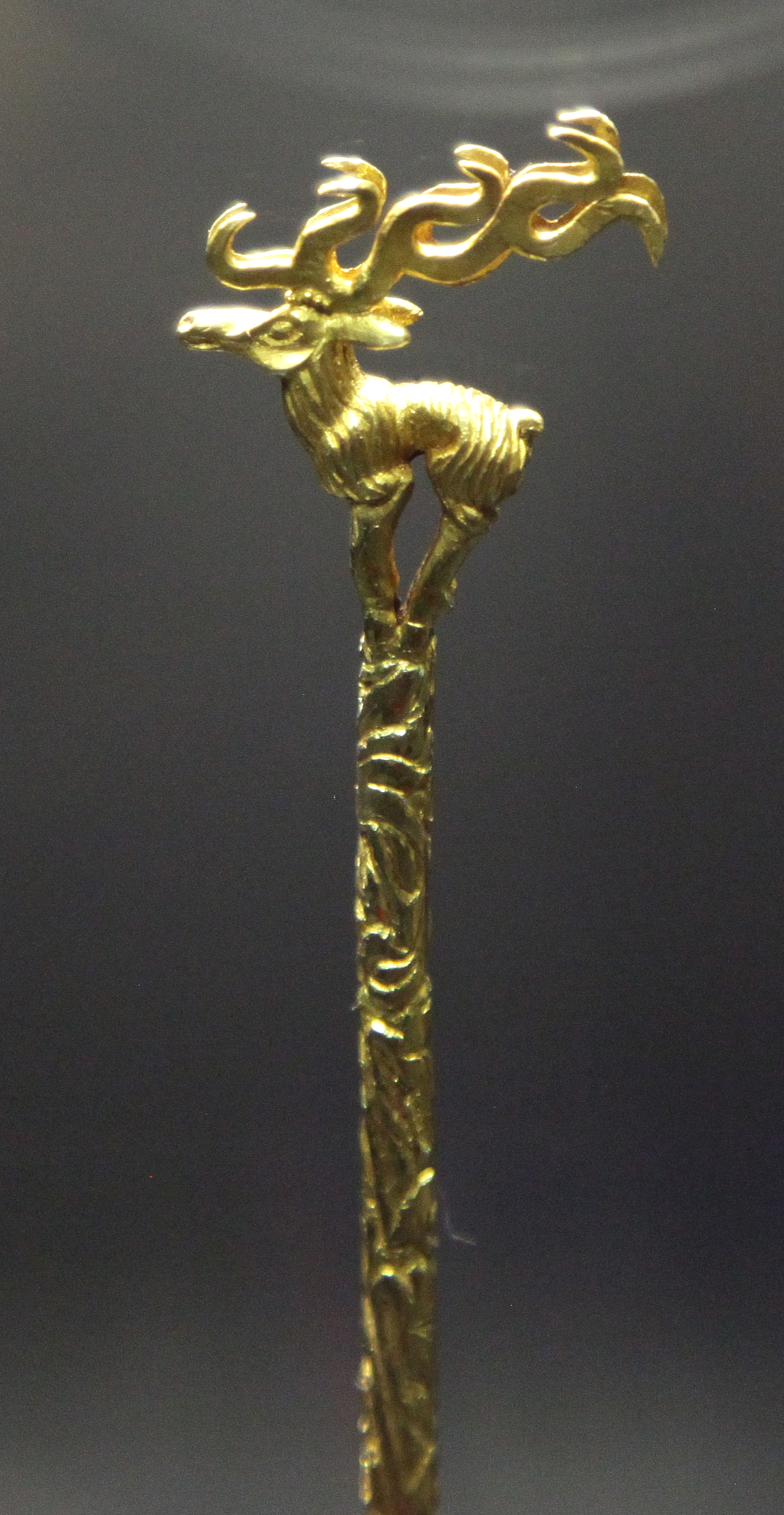
Arzhan deer pin.
