= Kokel culture =

Ancient community of southern Siberia

Coordinates: 51.458104°N 91.103251°E

Kokel Culture
- The Kokel Culture and contemporary cultures and polities circa 300 CE
- Geographical range: South Siberia
- Dates: 2nd to 5th century CE
- Major sites: Tunnug, Shurmak, Syyn-Churek, Katylyg
- Preceded by: Aldy-Bel culture, Pazyryk culture, Tagar culture, Xiongnu Empire
- Followed by: First Turkic Khaganate

The Kokel Culture (1st-5th centuries CE) is a post-Xiongnu culture, from Southern Siberia, in what is now the modern-day Tuva Republic. This culture is located temporally in the interval between the fall of the Xiongnu Empire (2nd century CE) and the rise of the First Turkic Khaganate (6th century CE). In Russian archaeology, it is considered as belonging to the "Hunno-Sarmatian period" (2nd century BCE and 5th century CE).

The Kokel culture has also been named "Syyn-Churek culture", or "Shurmak culture", based on the names of the sites of various archaeological discoveries.

Carbon dates for the Kokel sites generally range from the 2nd to the 4th centuries CE.

Kokel culture graves (2nd-4th century CE) tend to be found in conjunction with earlier graves of the Early Iron Age (9th century BCE-) Saka cultures, and the later graves of the Turkic period (5th century CE-).

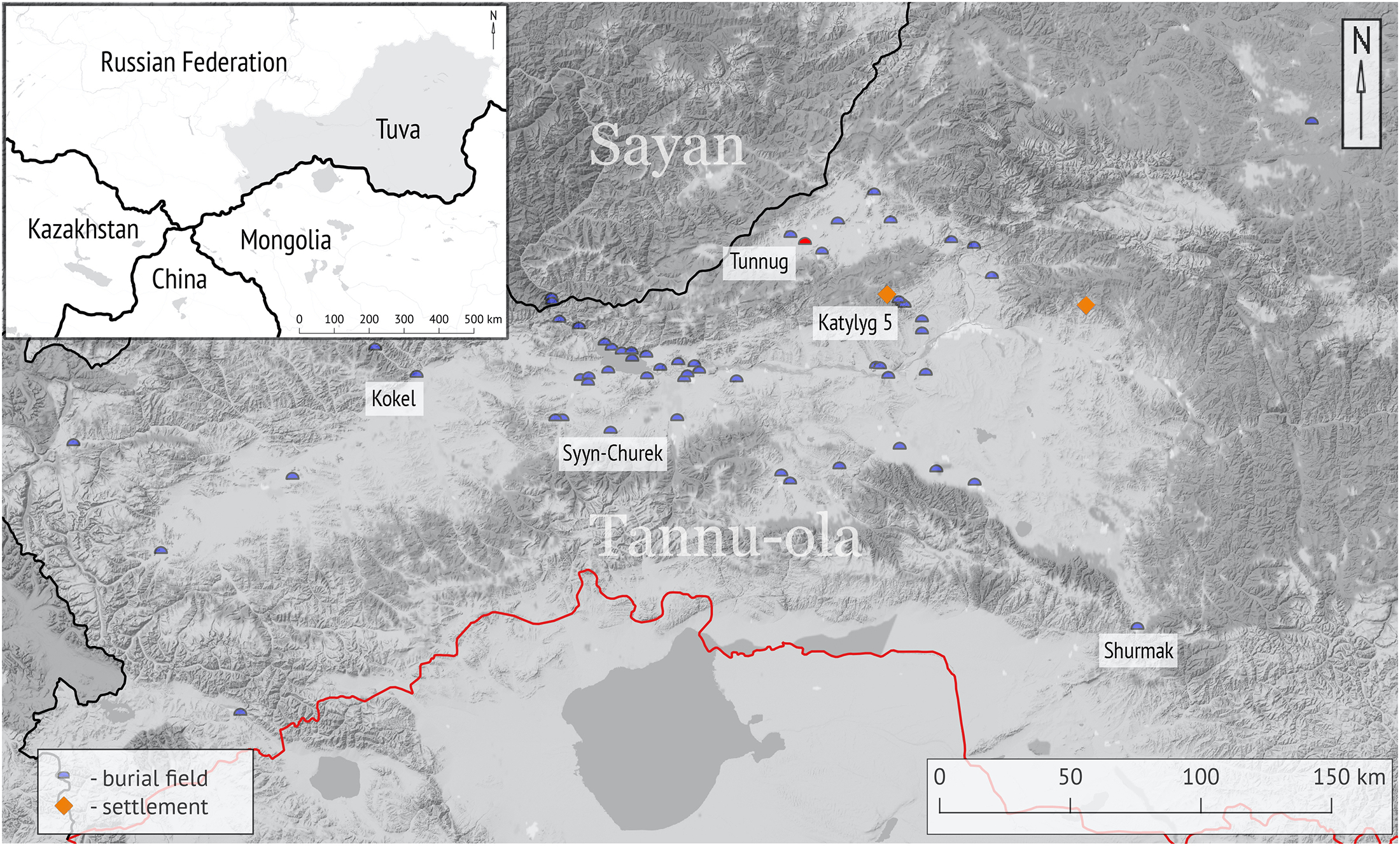
Sites of the Kokel culture, just north of the frontier with Mongolia

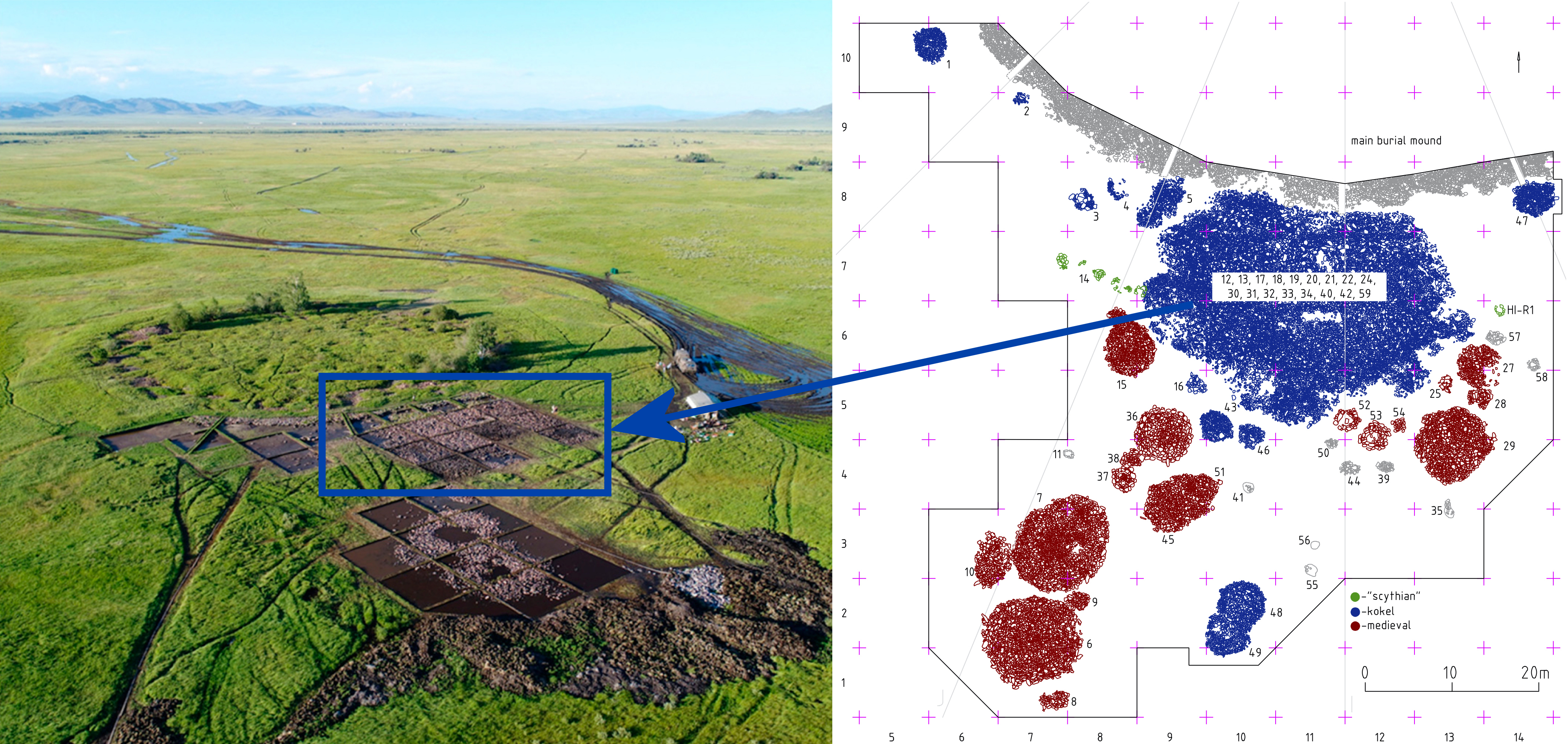
Kokel Culture cemetery, next to the Saka Arzhan tumulus at Tunnug 1, Tuva Republic.

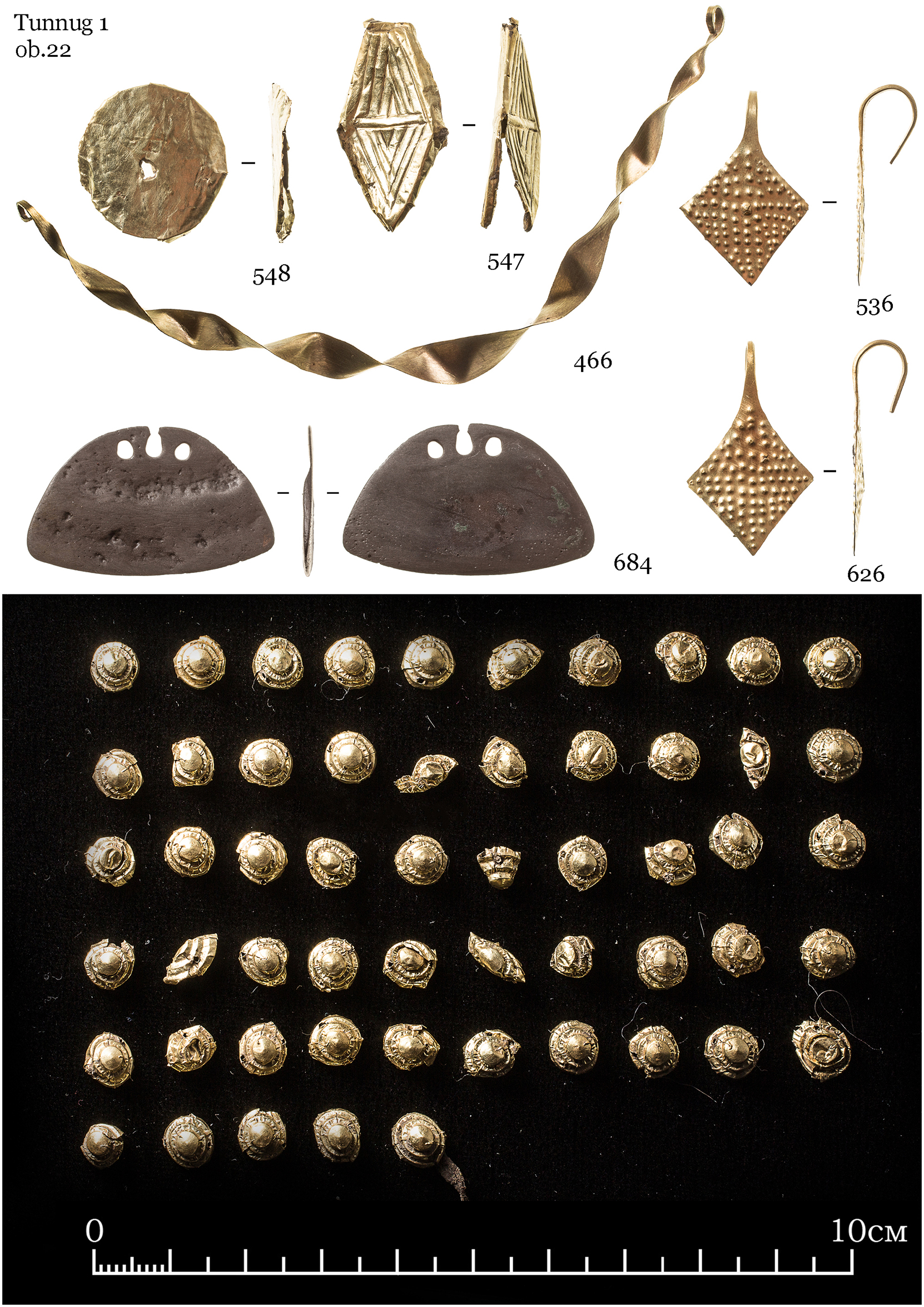
Kokel culture gold artifacts from Tunnug 1

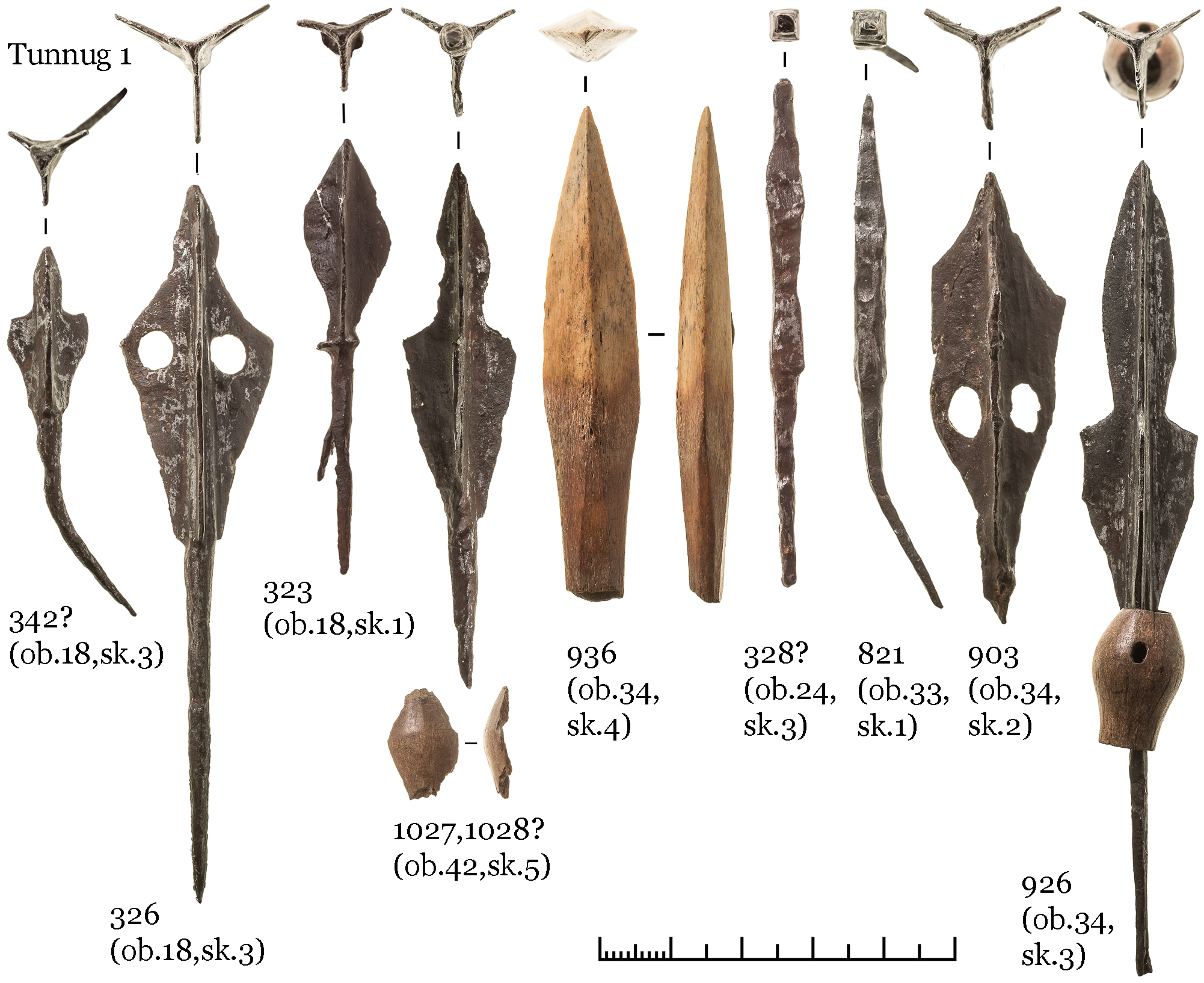
Arrowheads found in the skeletal remains of people of the Kokel culture

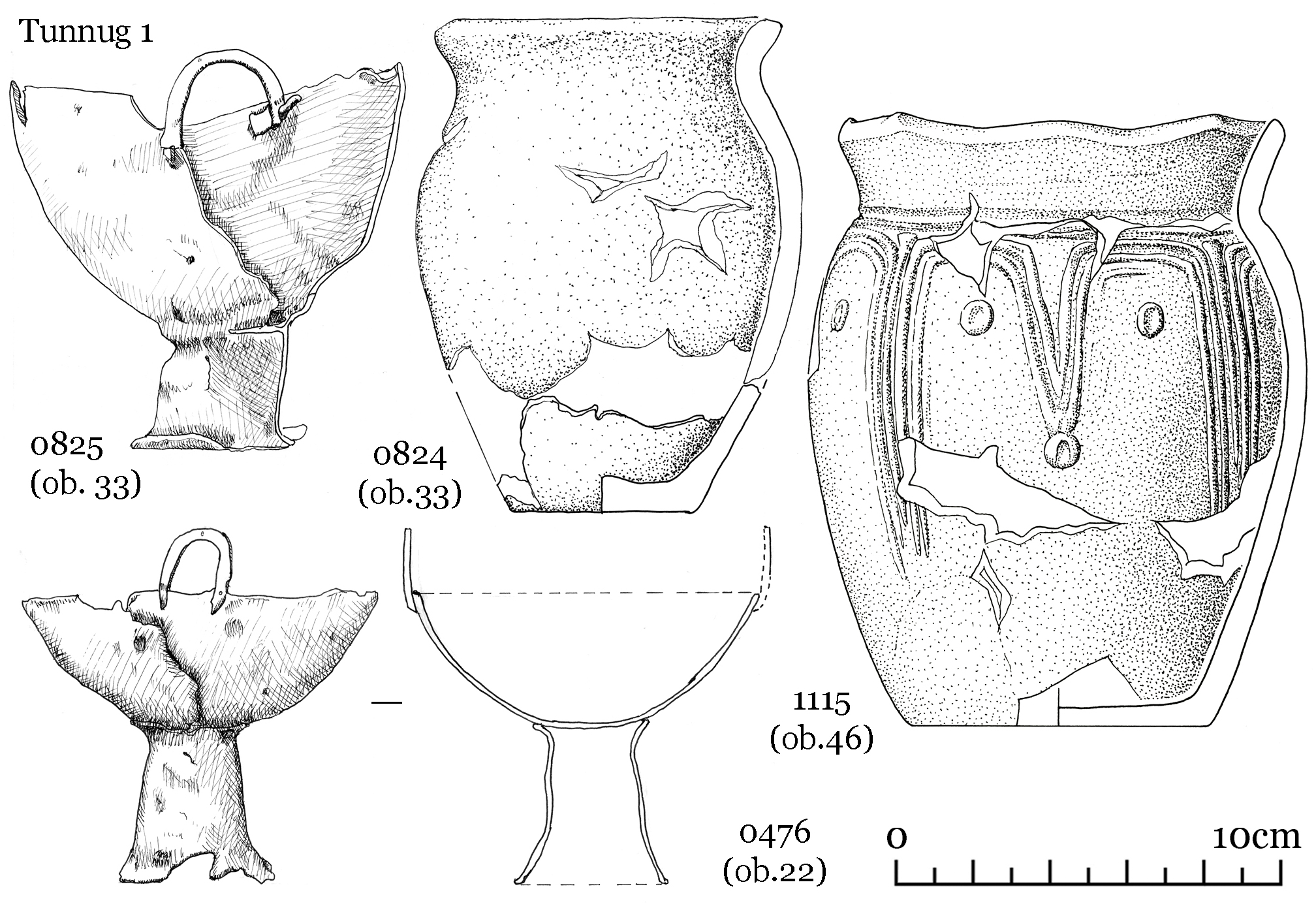
Kokel culture iron and ceramic vessels

== Sources ==
- Sadykov, Timur; Caspari, Gino; Blochin, Jegor; Lösch, Sandra; Kapinus, Yulija; Milella, Marco (16 July 2021). "The Kokel of Southern Siberia: New data on a post-Xiongnu material culture". PLOS ONE. 16 (7) e0254545. Bibcode:2021PLoSO..1654545S. doi:10.1371/journal.pone.0254545. ISSN 1932-6203. PMC 8284818. PMID 34270599.
- Chan, Annie; Sadykov, Timur; Blochin, Jegor; Hajdas, Irka; Caspari, Gino (22 September 2022). "The polymorphism and tradition of funerary practices of medieval Turks in light of new findings from Tuva Republic". PLOS ONE. 17 (9) e0274537. Bibcode:2022PLoSO..1774537C. doi:10.1371/journal.pone.0274537. PMC 9499277. PMID 36137099.
