= Sagly-Bazhy culture =

Ancient community of southern Siberia

Coordinates: 52.071606°N 93.631836°E

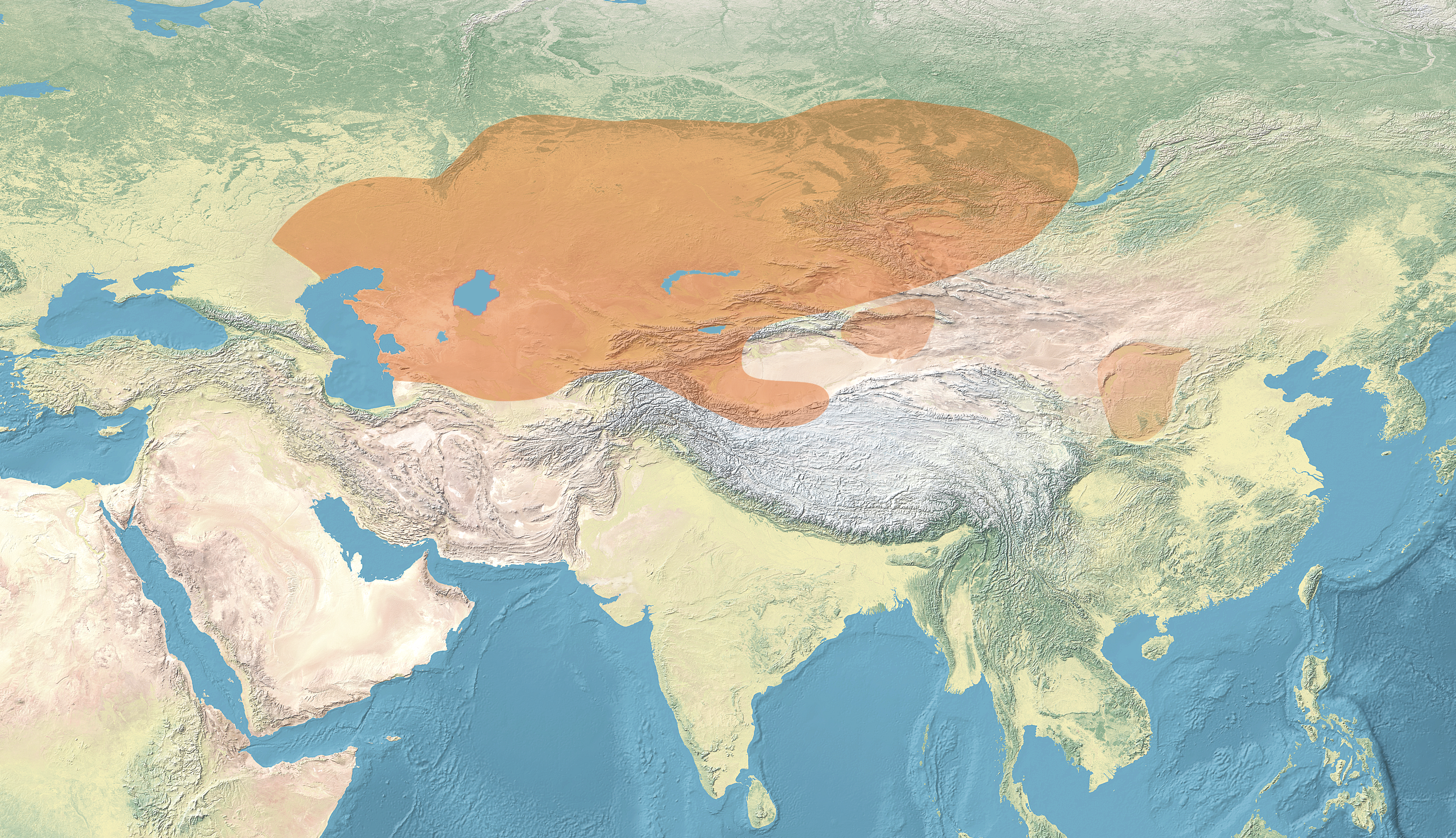
- Sagly-Bazy culture within the Saka realm ( ), and contemporary cultures and polities circa 325 BCE
- Geographical range: South Siberia
- Dates: 500 to 200 BCE.
- Preceded by: Arzhan culture, Aldy-Bel culture
- Followed by: Xiongnu Empire, Kokel Culture

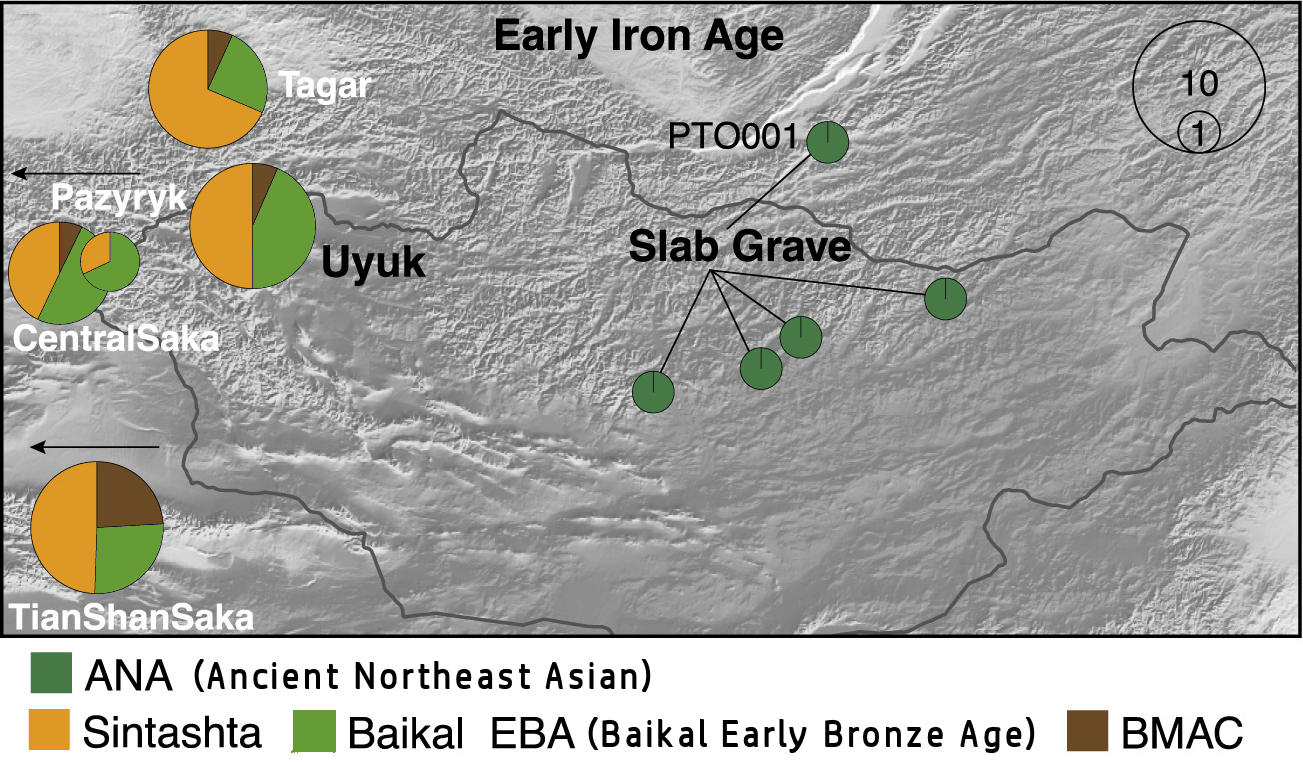
Early Iron Age Southern Siberian genetic ancestries. The Slab-grave people are uniformly of Ancient Northeast Asian (ANA, ) origin, while Saka populations to the west combined Sintashta, BMAC and Baikal_EBA ancestry (itself largely derived from Ancient Northeast Asian (ANA, ~80%), with a small admixture of Ancient North Eurasian (ANE, ~20%)).

The Sagly-Bazhy culture or Sagly/Uyuk culture, also known as Chandman culture in Mongolia (Ulaangom cemetery), refers to the Saka culture of the Sayan Mountains, in modern-day Tuva Republic. It is the last stage of the Uyuk culture.

This period of Scythian culture covers a period from the 5th century BCE to the 2nd century BCE, and follows the Arzhan culture (8th century BCE), and the Aldy-Bel culture (7th-6th century BCE) in the same location. These Scythian cultures would ultimately be replaced by the Xiongnu Empire and the Kokel Culture.

Nearby Saka cultures were the Tagar Culture of the Minusinsk Basin, as well as the Pazyryk Culture (ca. 500–200 BCE) in the Altai Mountains and the Saka culture (ca. 900–200 BCE), to which the Sagly-Bazy culture was strongly related. To the east was the Slab-grave culture.

The Sagly-Bazhy culture stopped to exist in the 2nd century BCE as a result of Xiongnu invasions.

== Genetics ==
In 2019, a genetic study of remains from the Sagly-Bazhy culture was published in Human Genetics. The 5 male samples were found to be carriers of the East Eurasian haplogroups Q-L54.

Significant genetic differences were found between the Eastern Scythians and the Western Scythians of the Pontic steppe. The two groups appear to have been of completely different paternal origins, with almost no paternal gene flow between them. On the other hand, there is strong evidence of shared maternal DNA between Scythian cultures, indicating maternal geneflow from East Eurasia to West Eurasia.

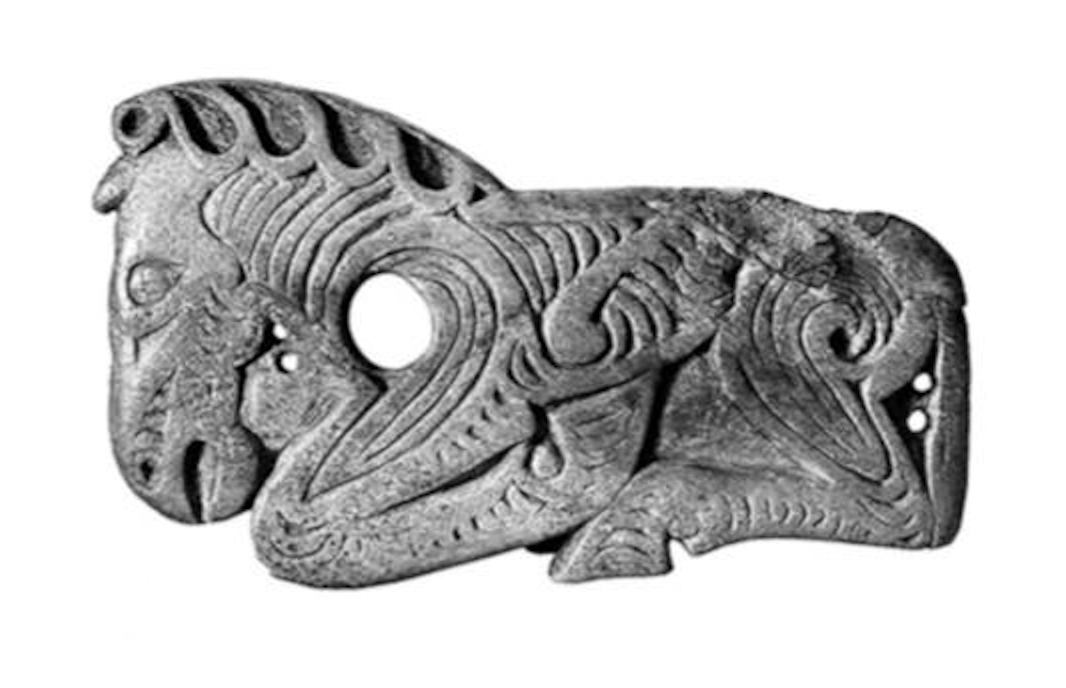
Animal style artifact Sagly-Bazhi II (Tuva).

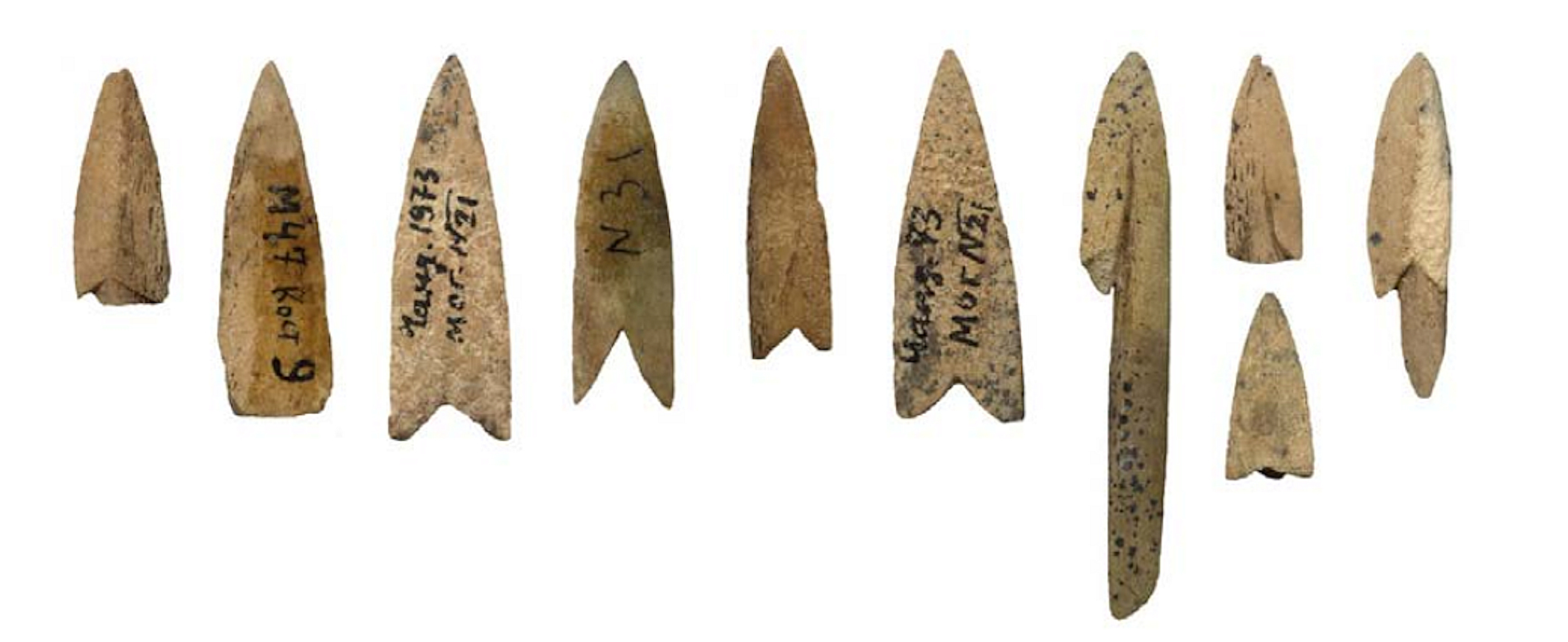
Bone arrowheads of the Chandmani culture, Western Mongolia

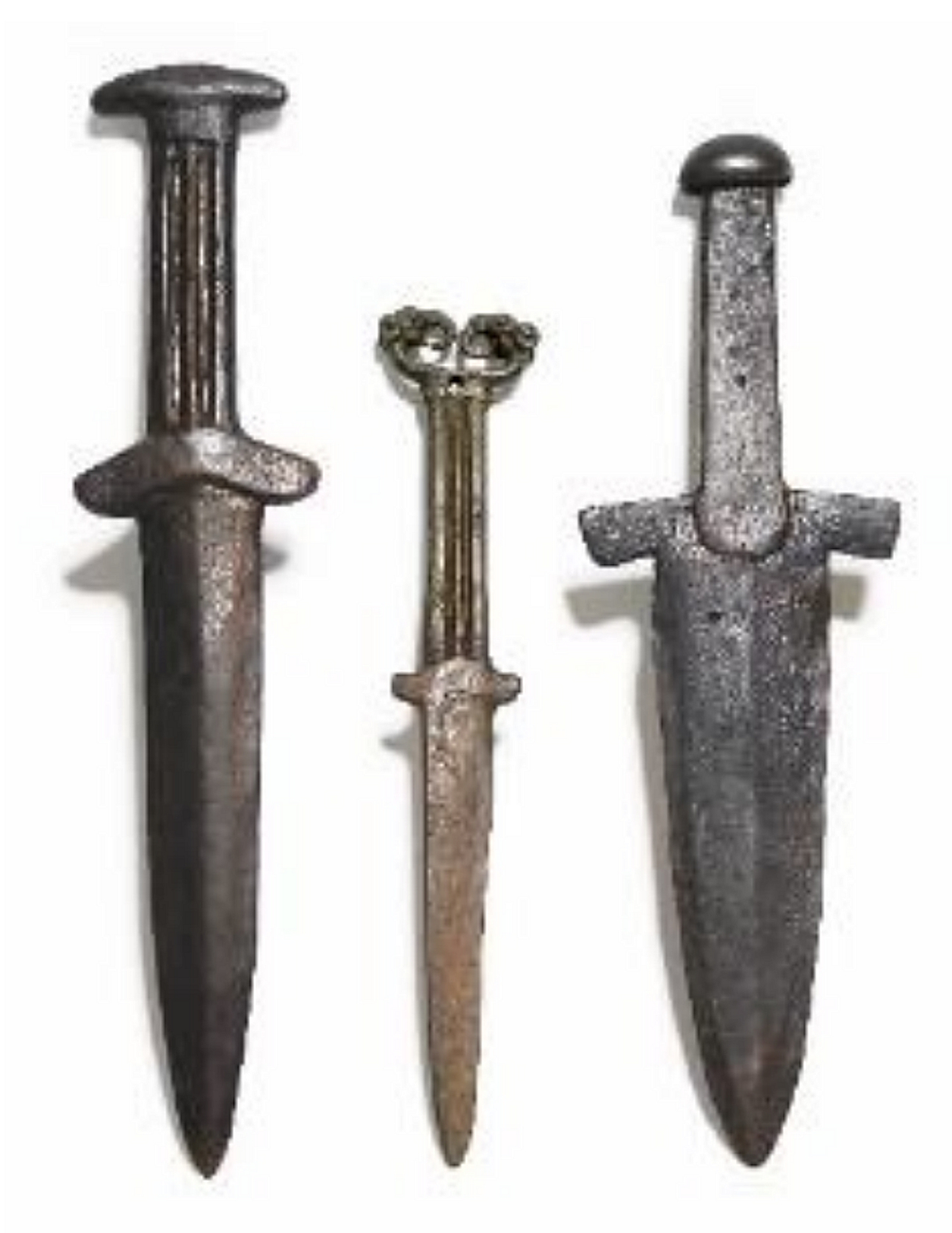
Bronze daggers of the Chandmani culture, Western Mongolia.

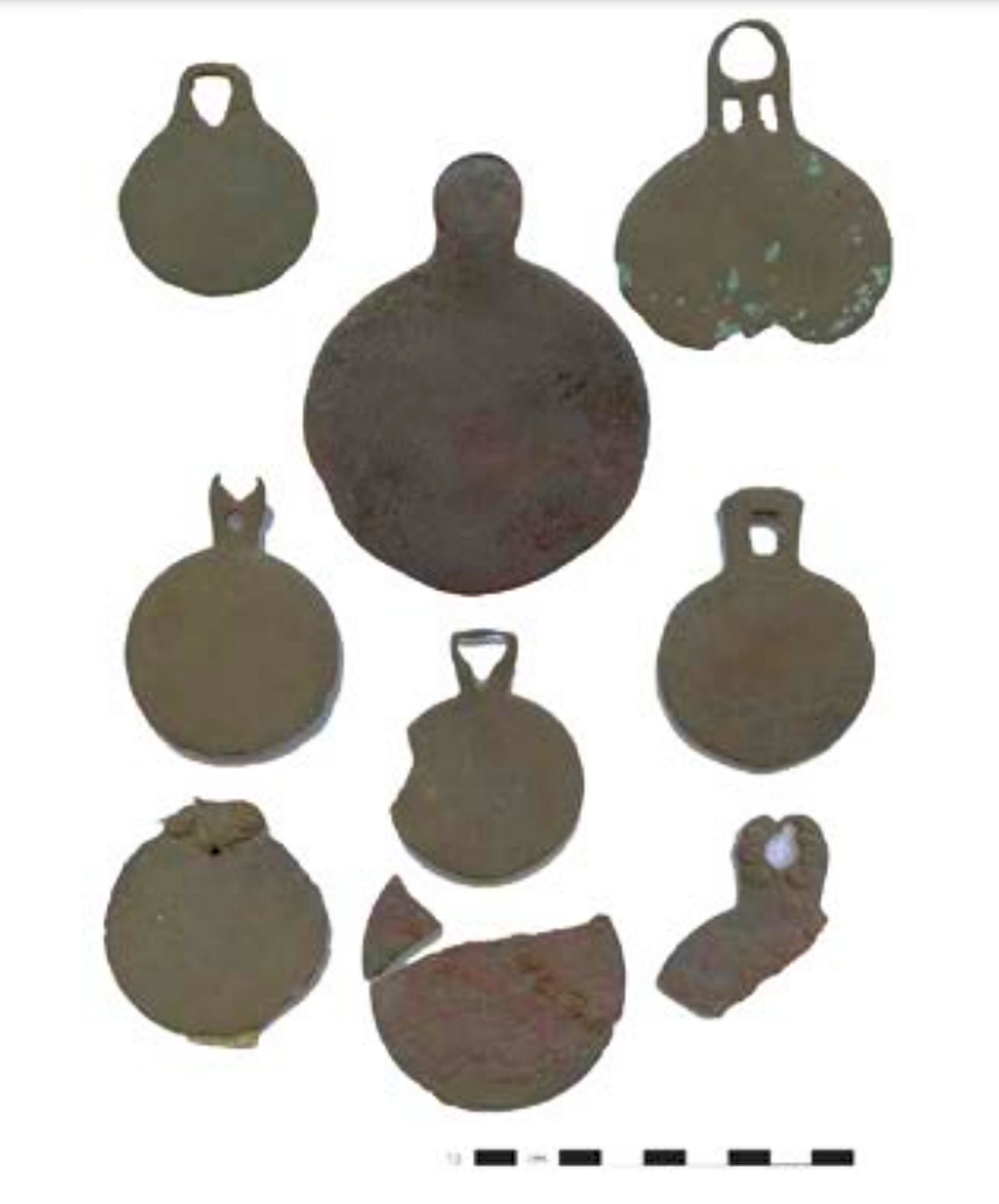
Bronze mirrors, Chandmani culture, Western Mongolia

== Sources ==
- Jeong, Choongwon; Wang, Ke; Wilkin, Shevan; Taylor, William Timothy Treal; Miller, Bryan K.; Bemmann, Jan H.; Stahl, Raphaela; Chiovelli, Chelsea; Knolle, Florian; Ulziibayar, Sodnom; Khatanbaatar, Dorjpurev; Erdenebaatar, Diimaajav; Erdenebat, Ulambayar; Ochir, Ayudai; Ankhsanaa, Ganbold; Vanchigdash, Chuluunkhuu; Ochir, Battuga; Munkhbayar, Chuluunbat; Tumen, Dashzeveg; Kovalev, Alexey; Kradin, Nikolay; Bazarov, Bilikto A.; Miyagashev, Denis A.; Konovalov, Prokopiy B.; Zhambaltarova, Elena; Miller, Alicia Ventresca; Haak, Wolfgang; Schiffels, Stephan; Krause, Johannes; Boivin, Nicole; Erdene, Myagmar; Hendy, Jessica; Warinner, Christina (12 November 2020). "A Dynamic 6,000-Year Genetic History of Eurasia's Eastern Steppe". Cell. 183 (4): 890–904. doi:10.1016/j.cell.2020.10.015. hdl:21.11116/0000-0007-77BF-D. ISSN 0092-8674. PMC 7664836. PMID 33157037.
