= Ulaanzuukh culture =

Bronze Age archaeological culture in eastern Mongolia

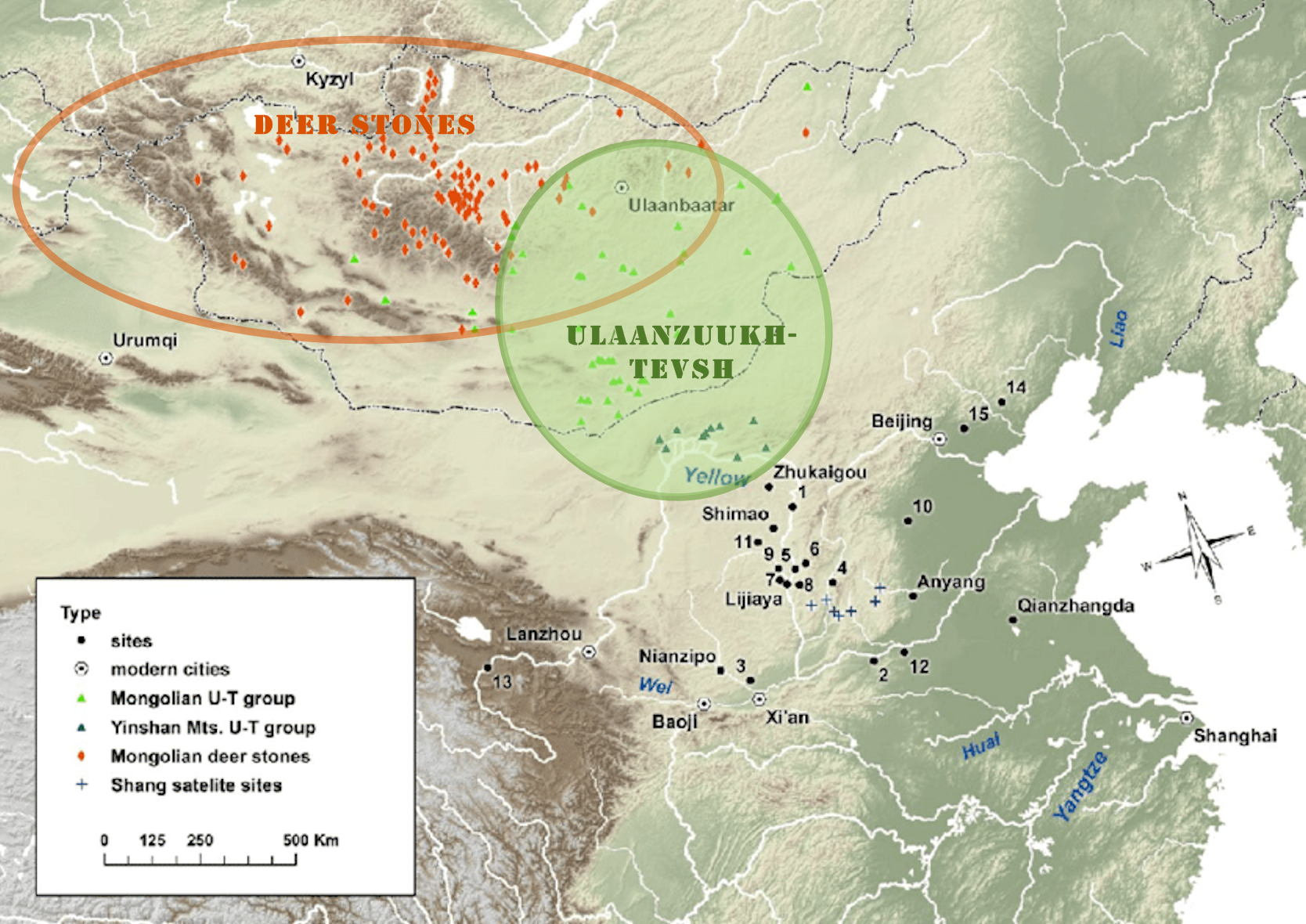
- Geographical range: Mongolia
- Period: Bronze Age, Iron Age
- Dates: 1450–1000 BC
- Preceded by: Ancient Northeast Asians
- Followed by: Slab Grave culture

The Ulaanzuukh culture, also Ulaanzuukh-Tevsh culture (Ch:乌兰朱和文化, c. 1450–1000 BCE), is an archaeological culture of the Late Bronze Age eastern Mongolia. It likely preceded and was the origin of the Slab-grave culture.

== Genetic profile ==
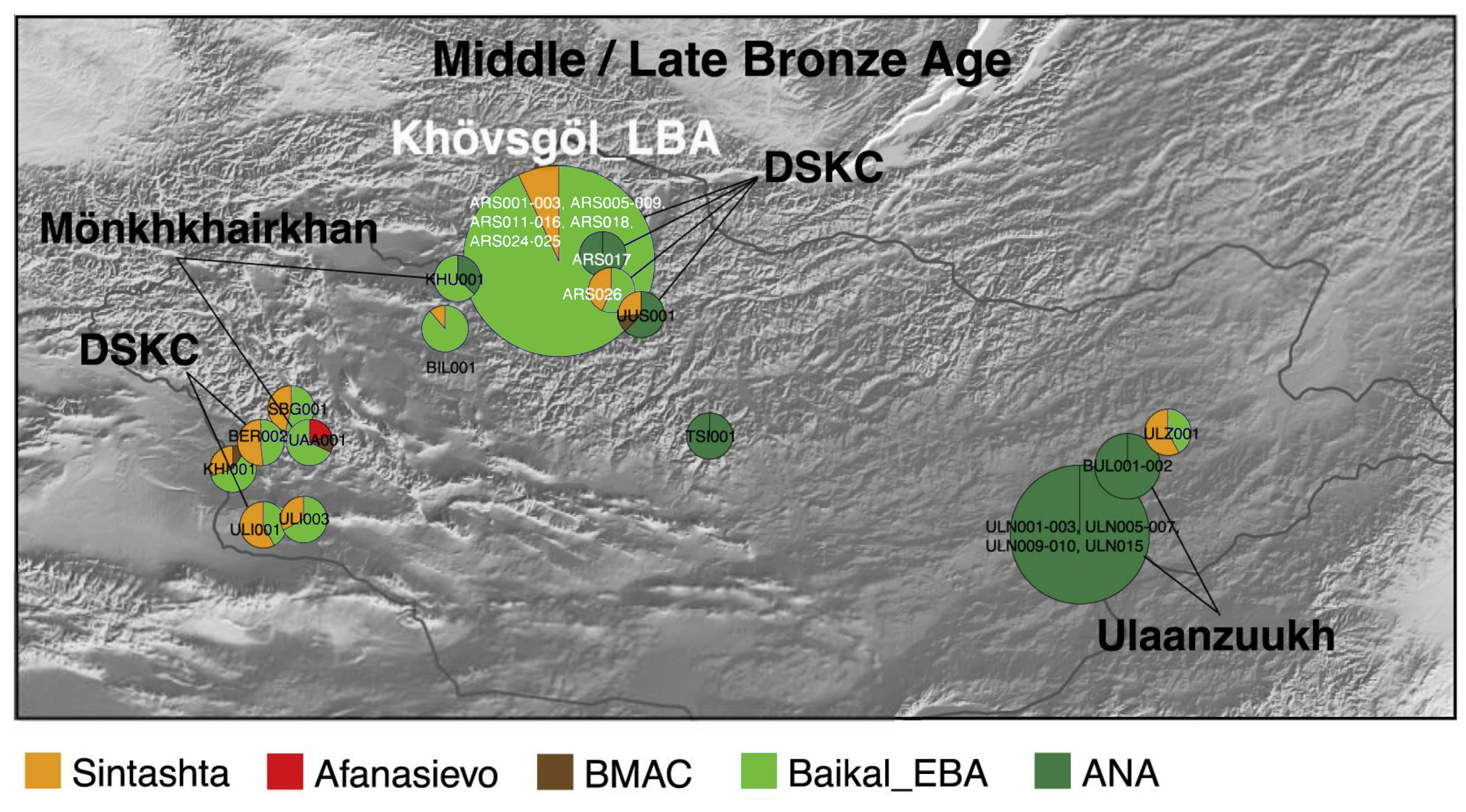
Genetic profile of the Ulaanzuukh culture in southeast Mongolia, against the Deer stone culture in western and northern Mongolia.

The genetic profile of individuals belonging to this culture is virtually identical to the profile of Slab Grave culture individuals, which is consistent with the hypothesis that the Slab Grave culture emerged from the Ulaanzuukh. Genetically, the populations of the Ulaanzuukh culture were rather homogeneous, and part of the Ancient Northeast Asians (ANA). In a recent study, they have been shown to have a purely Northeast Asian profile (nearly 100% ANA), with one outlier having a western Altai_MLBA profile. The Ulaanzuukh culture was genetically distinct from the Deer stone culture, located in western and northern Mongolia.

The Ulaanzuukh and Slab Grave culture individuals cluster closely together and are collectively referred to as the "Ulaanzuukh_SlabGrave genetic cluster". The later Xiongnu are inferred to have formed via the merger of Eastern Saka (Chandman culture) and the local Ancient Northeast Asian, Ulaanzuukh-Slab Grave culture, which corresponds with the presence of both Iranian and Turkic languages among them. The analysis of the ancient genome of Empress Ashina, a ruler of the clan of the Göktürks, was shown to display close genetic affinities with the Slab Grave and Ulaanzuukh culture remains.

According to a 2023 study, Ulaanzuukh individuals are adequately modeled as having a 24.5% contribution from Khövsgöl_LBA although some outlier individuals have even higher inputs from them. The rest of their genomes derives from ANA, represented by pre-Bronze Age eastern Mongolians. Khövsgöl_LBA has been previously described as being a mixture of Early Neolithic Baikalians, Altai hunter-gatherers and Sintashta_MLBA-related populations.

== Influences ==
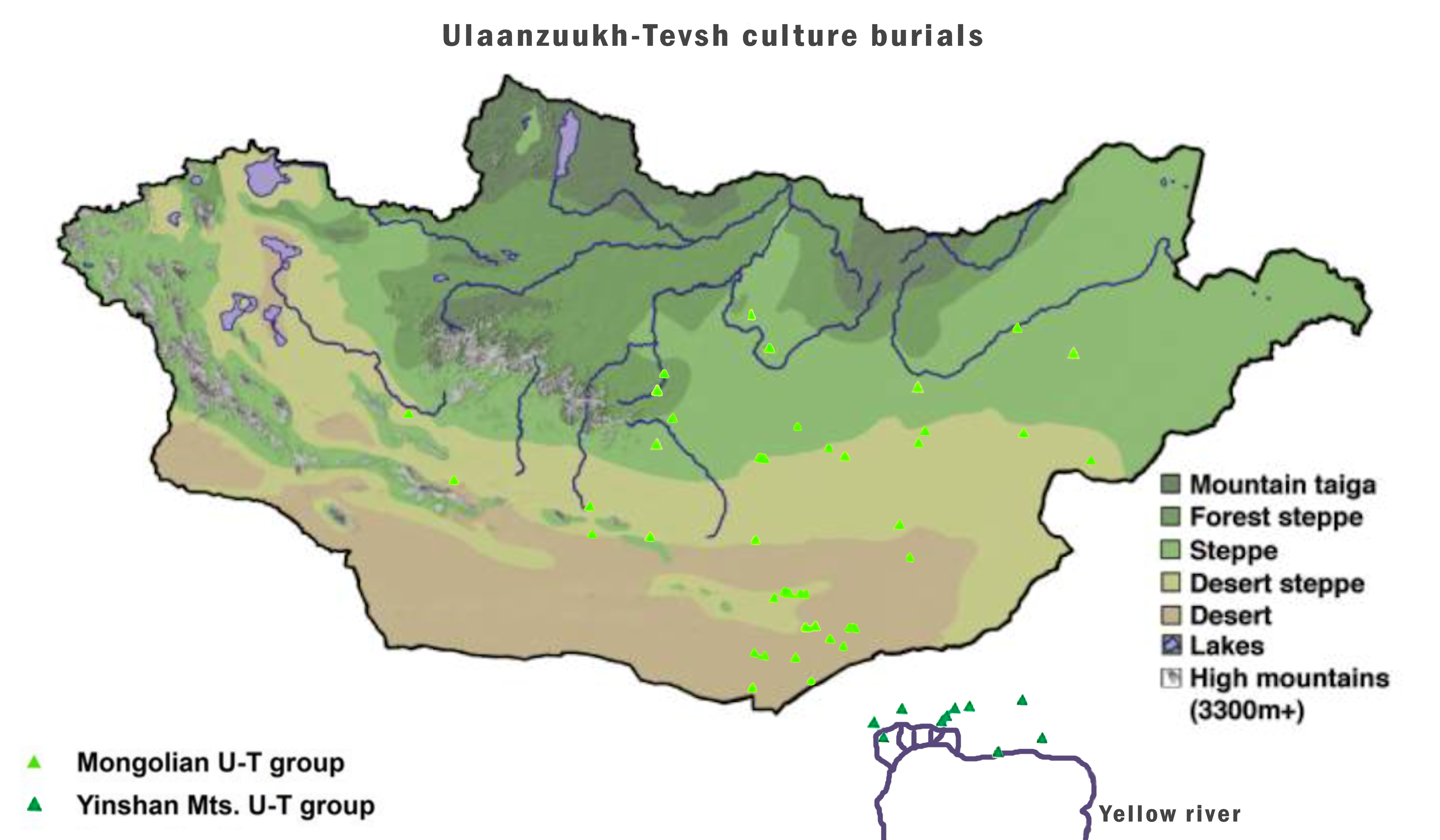
Ulaanzuukh-Tevsh burials are located in the most arid parts of Mongolia, in the south, as far as the bend of the Yellow River.

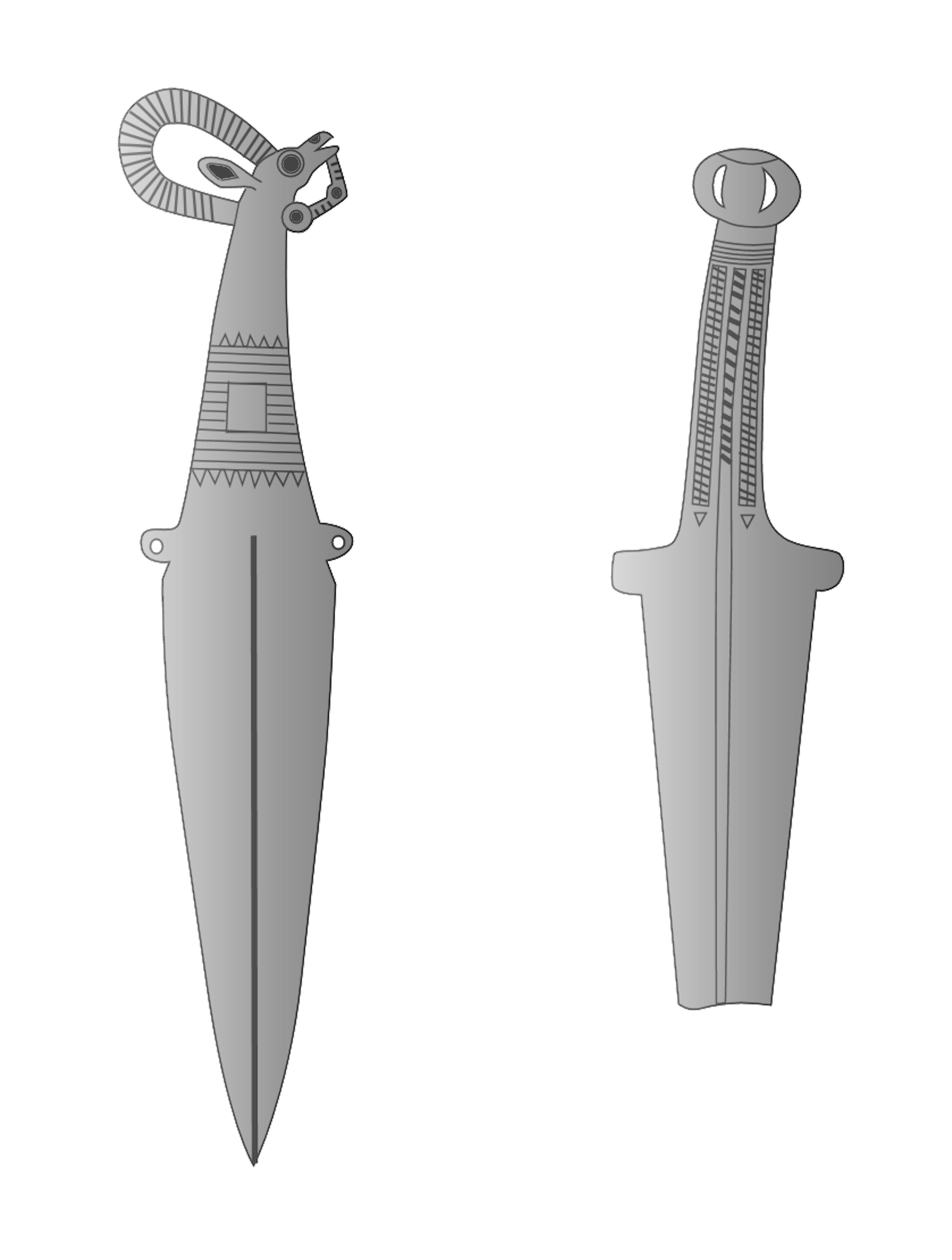
Dagger with an animal head from Bayankhongor Province (Tevsh culture) and jingle-head knife from Zavkhan Province, Mongolia. These are "chance finds": they have not been directly related to Ulaanzuukh-Tevsh burials.

The Ulaanzuukh culture may have contributed to the transfer of the chariot and weapon technologies and designs to Shang dynasty China, which originated with the Deer stones culture of the Mongolian plateau. Daggers found in Ulaanzuukh graves have broadly similar designs to those of the Deer stones culture, with curved blades and pommels decorated with the heads of animals or with "jingles", which are key design elements adopted by the Shang dynasty for their weaponery.

== Sources ==
- Jeong, Choongwon; Wang, Ke; Wilkin, Shevan; Taylor, William Timothy Treal; Miller, Bryan K.; Bemmann, Jan H.; Stahl, Raphaela; Chiovelli, Chelsea; Knolle, Florian; Ulziibayar, Sodnom; Khatanbaatar, Dorjpurev; Erdenebaatar, Diimaajav; Erdenebat, Ulambayar; Ochir, Ayudai; Ankhsanaa, Ganbold; Vanchigdash, Chuluunkhuu; Ochir, Battuga; Munkhbayar, Chuluunbat; Tumen, Dashzeveg; Kovalev, Alexey; Kradin, Nikolay; Bazarov, Bilikto A.; Miyagashev, Denis A.; Konovalov, Prokopiy B.; Zhambaltarova, Elena; Miller, Alicia Ventresca; Haak, Wolfgang; Schiffels, Stephan; Krause, Johannes; Boivin, Nicole; Erdene, Myagmar; Hendy, Jessica; Warinner, Christina (12 November 2020). "A Dynamic 6,000-Year Genetic History of Eurasia's Eastern Steppe". Cell. 183 (4): 890–904.e29. doi:10.1016/j.cell.2020.10.015. hdl:21.11116/0000-0007-77BF-D. ISSN 0092-8674. PMC 7664836. PMID 33157037.
- Lee, Juhyeon (14 April 2023). "Genetic population structure of the Xiongnu Empire at imperial and local scales". Science Advances. 9 (15) eadf3904. Bibcode:2023SciA....9F3904L. doi:10.1126/sciadv.adf3904. ISSN 2375-2548. PMC 10104459. PMID 37058560.
- Rawson, Jessica (June 2020). "Chariotry and Prone Burials: Reassessing Late Shang China's Relationship with Its Northern Neighbours". Journal of World Prehistory. 33 (2): 135–168. doi:10.1007/s10963-020-09142-4.
