= Chandman culture =

Archaeological culture in Mongolia

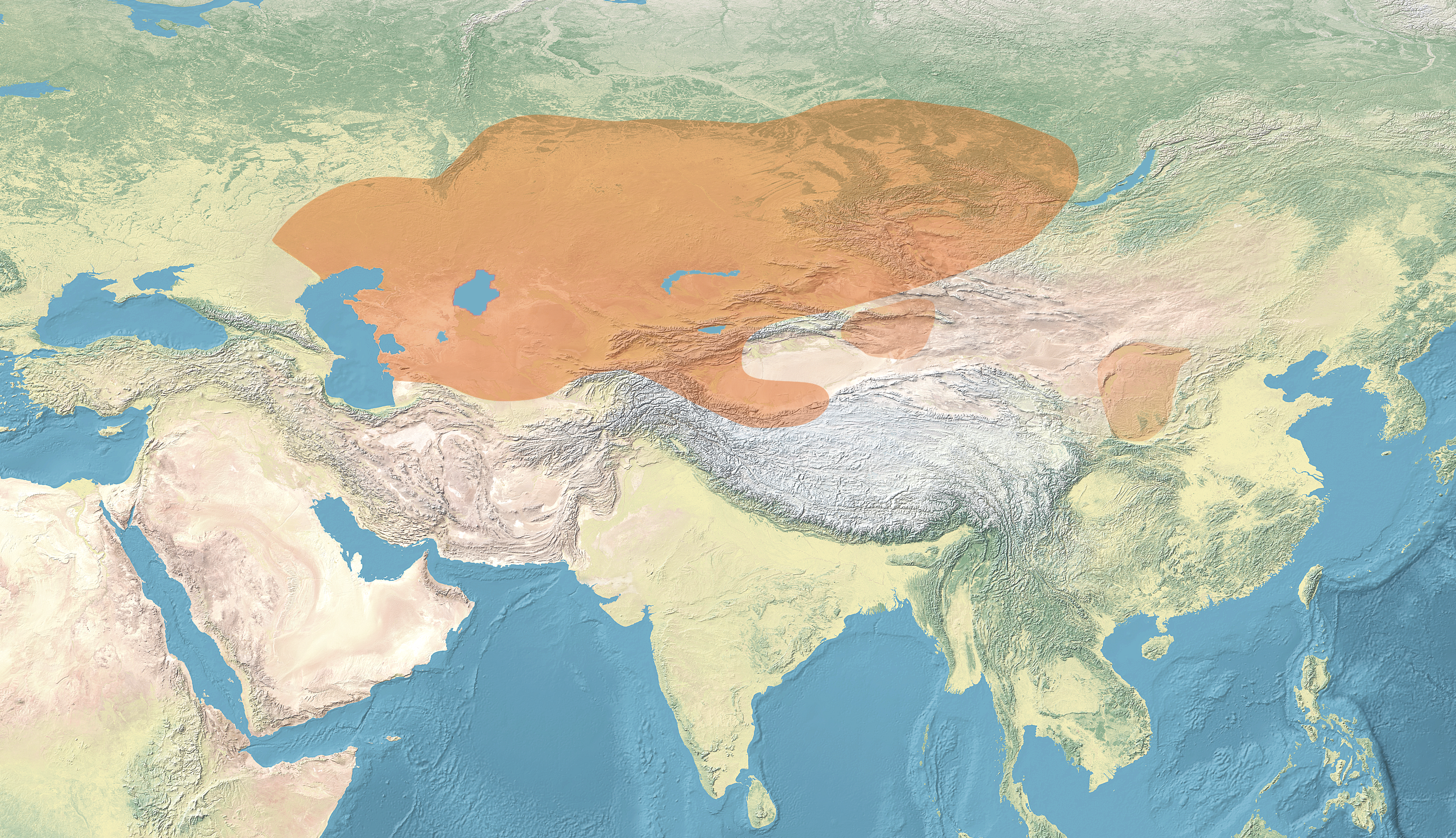
- Chandman culture within the Saka realm ( ), and contemporary cultures and polities circa 325 BCE, with location of the Chandman Ulaangom cemetery
- Geographical range: Western Mongolia
- Dates: 7th to 3rd centuries BC
- Preceded by: Deer stones culture
- Followed by: Xiongnu

The Chandman culture, also known as Chandmani culture, was a nomadic culture that existed in northwestern Mongolia and southern Siberia during the Iron Age, and is also known as the "Sagly-Bazhy culture" on the Russian side of the frontier. It is associated with the Eastern Scythian/Saka horizon, and is part of the more general Saka Uyuk culture.

== History ==
The Chandman culture was excavated by Russian and Mongolian archaeologists in the 1970s near Chandmani Mountain, which is located near the city of Ulaangom, Uvs Province.

Radiocarbon dating of the Chandman remains ranges from 700 BCE to 300 BCE, a period spanning the Mongolian Iron Age. The Chandman culture has been linked to the nearby cultures at Sagly and Uyuk, and is part of the Scythian Saka culture.

== Population ==
The Chandman population seems to have been in particularly good health, as their skeletal remains show little evidence of pathological disease. Dental and skeletal evidence show no signs of stress. However other analyses have shown injuries in the Chandman population related to horseback riding and combat. Several Chandman graves contained war hammers, and the cranial injuries associated with their use. The Chandman population likely practiced dairying, as dental remains show evidence of milk consumption.

== Archaeogenetics ==
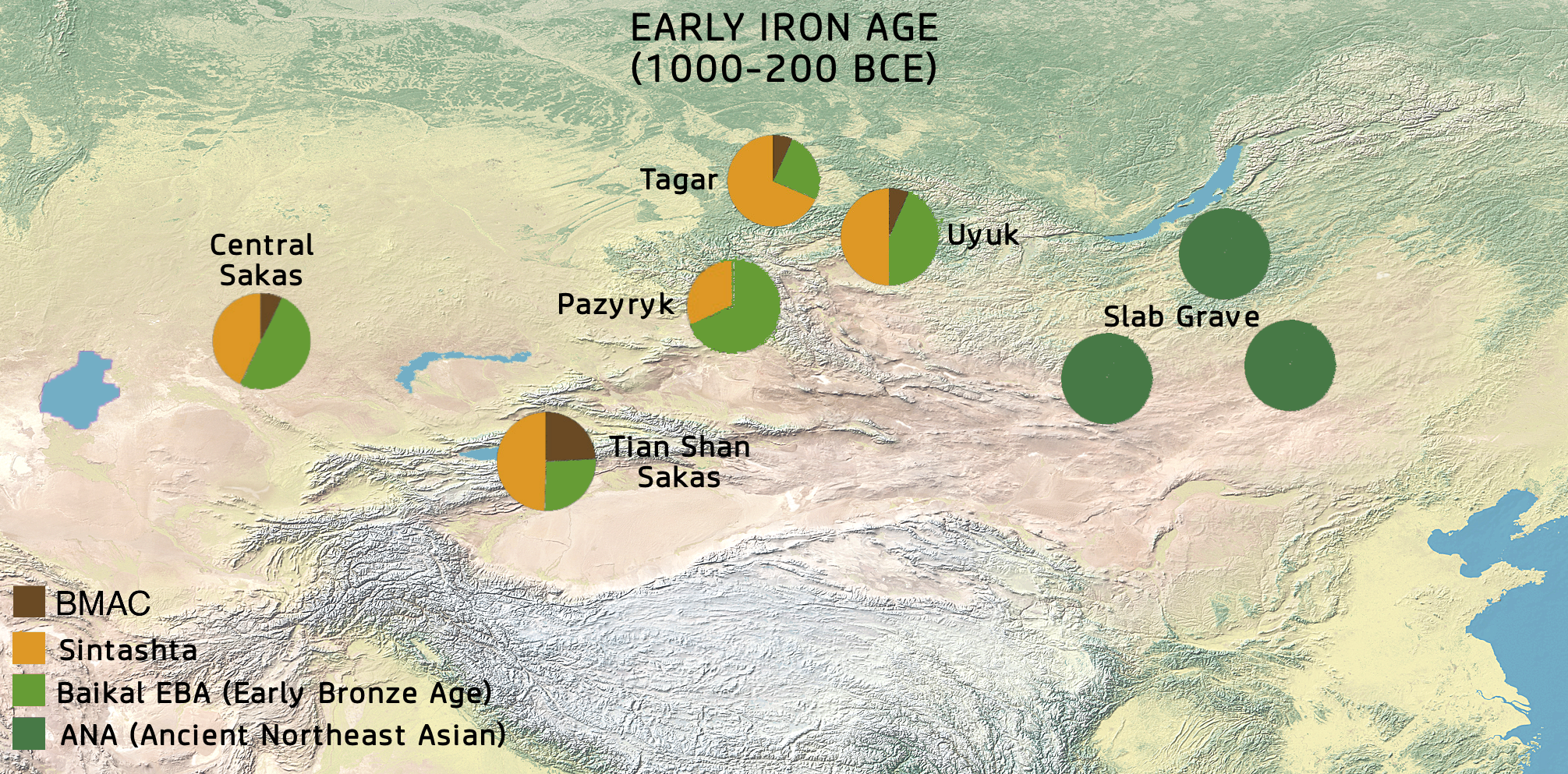
The Chandman/Uyuk genetic profile was a near-equal combination of West Eurasian Sintashta and Ancient Northeast Asian (Baikal EBA) ancestry, with a small BMAC admixture.

A 2020 study analyzed the DNA of Chandman fossils, and described them as a mixed population, with 51.3% of their ancestry being derived from the West Eurasian Sintashta culture, and an additional 42.2% from an East Eurasian population from Lake Baikal (Baikal EBA), Mongolia. 6.5% of their ancestry was related to the Bactria–Margiana Archaeological Complex population of Central Asia, which was closely related to Neolithic populations of the Iranian plateau and the Caucasus hunter-gatherers.

Strong evidence of sex bias was found in the ancestry of the Chandman population. Western Steppe Herder ancestry (from a Sintashta-like source) in the Chandman population was inherited from more male than female ancestors.

Chandman males were found to be carrying the paternal haplogroups R-Z2122, R-Z93, R-Z645, Q-L332 (two samples) and Q-L213.

Jeong, et al. found that the early Western Xiongnu derived 93% of their ancestry from the Chandman culture, and 7% consisted of newly introduced BMAC ancestry. The rest of the Xiongnu in the study generally had mainly Eastern Asian (Ulaanzuukh or Slab Grave) ancestry, combined with smaller Western Eurasian (Chandman, Sarmatian, BMAC) contributions. A study of the relationship between ethnicity and social status in the Xiongnu Empire suggested that the ancestry of high status individuals among the Xiongnu essentially derived from the Eastern Eurasian Slab Grave culture, while retainers of comparatively lower status had high genetic heterogeneity, representing influxes from the many parts of the Xiongnu Empire, and included Chandman-related individuals.

== Gallery ==
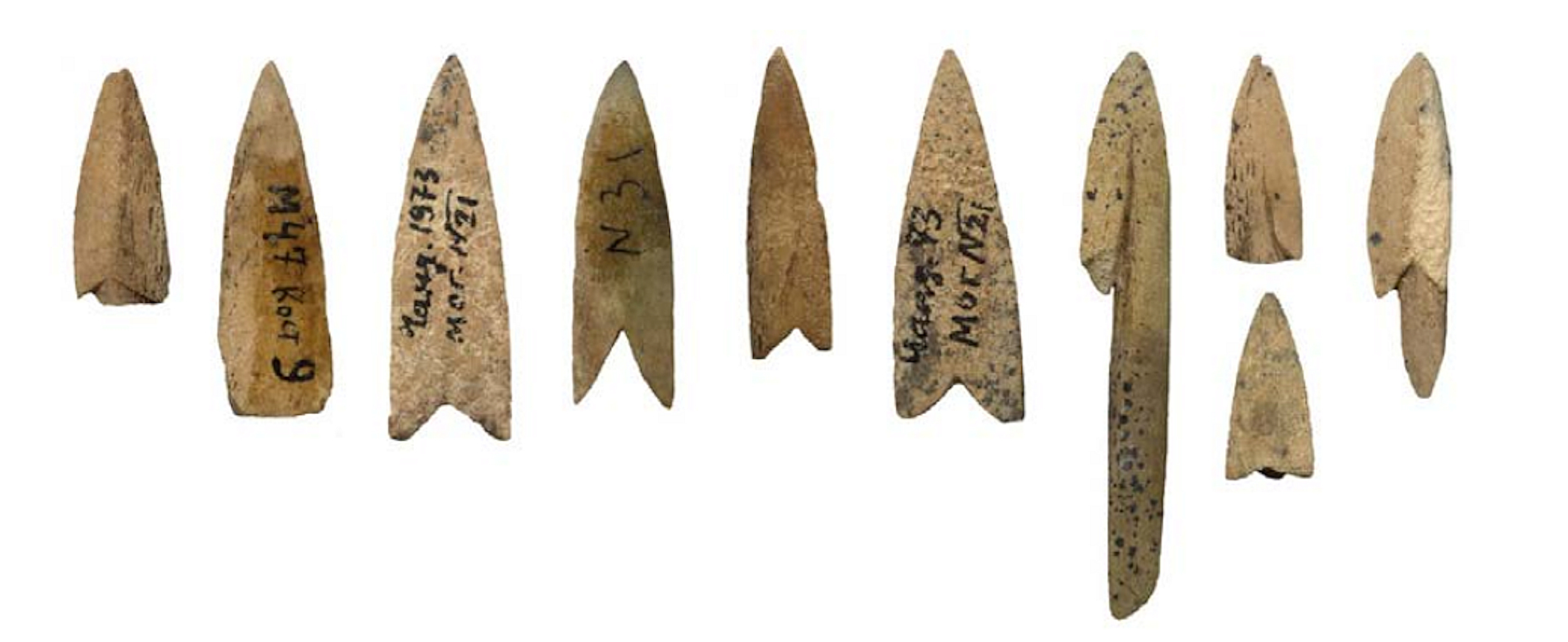
Bone arrowheads of Chandmani-Sagil culture, Western Mongolia

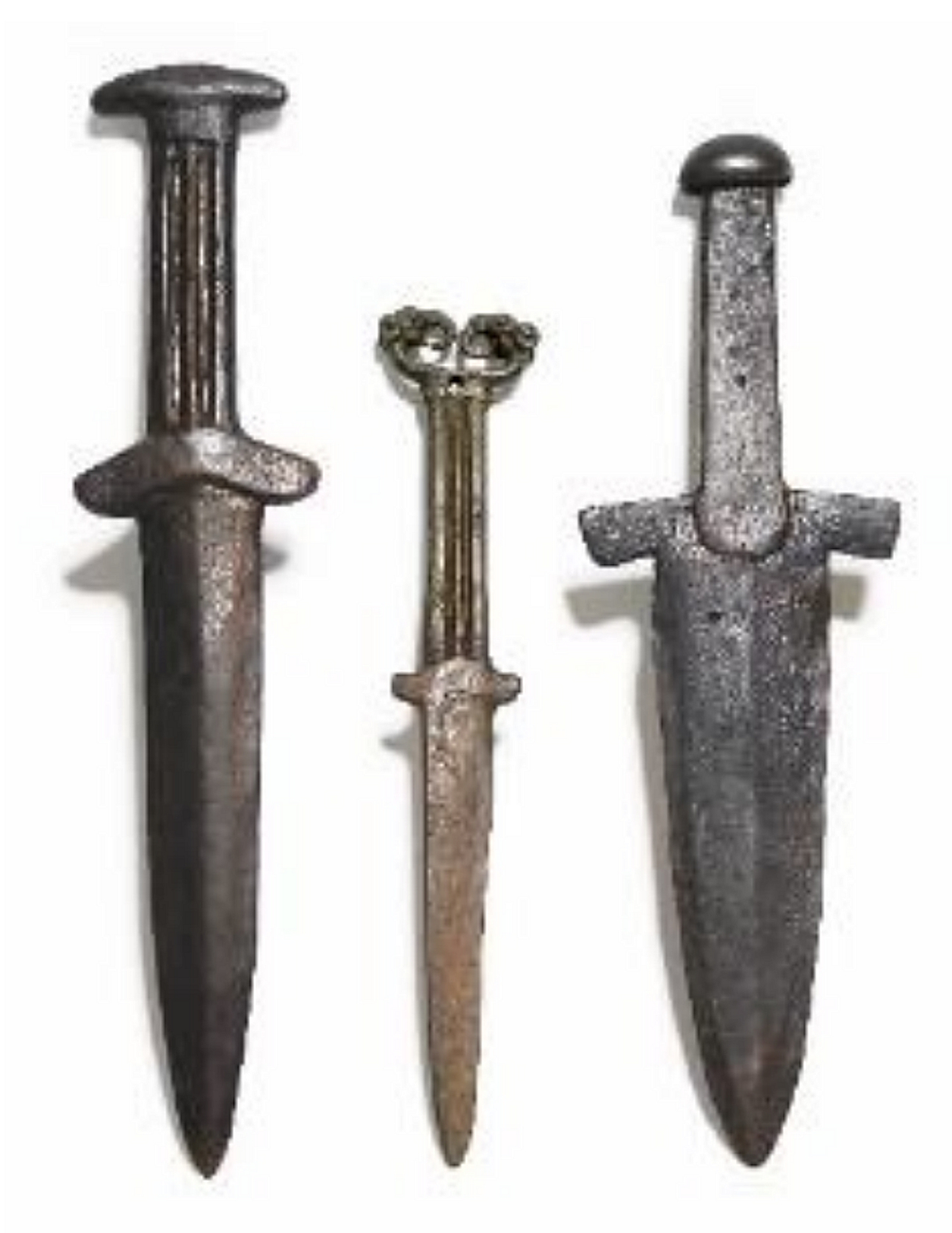
Bronze daggers of Chandmani-Sagil, Western Mongolia.

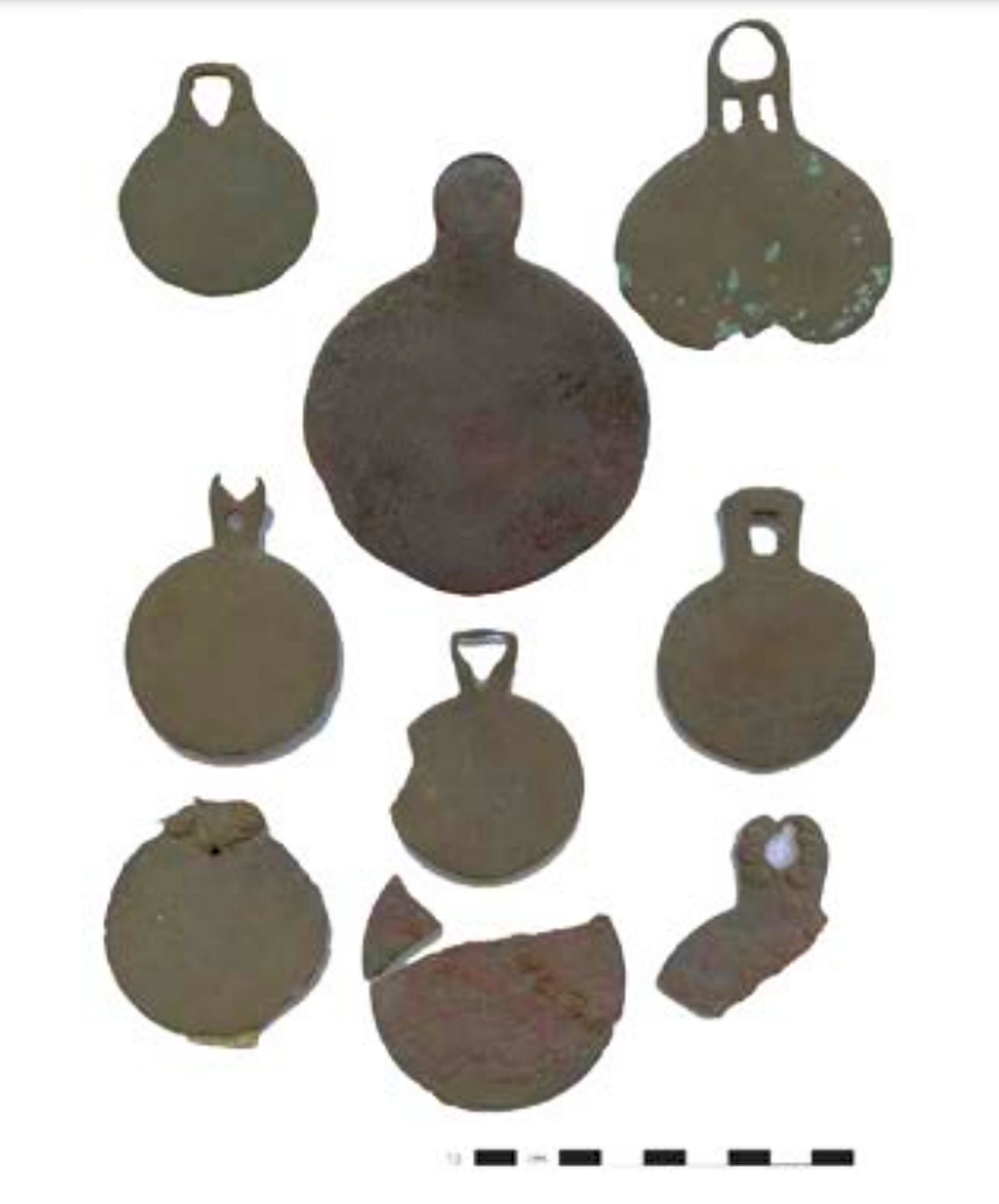
Bronze mirrors Chandmani-Sagil culture, Western Mongolia

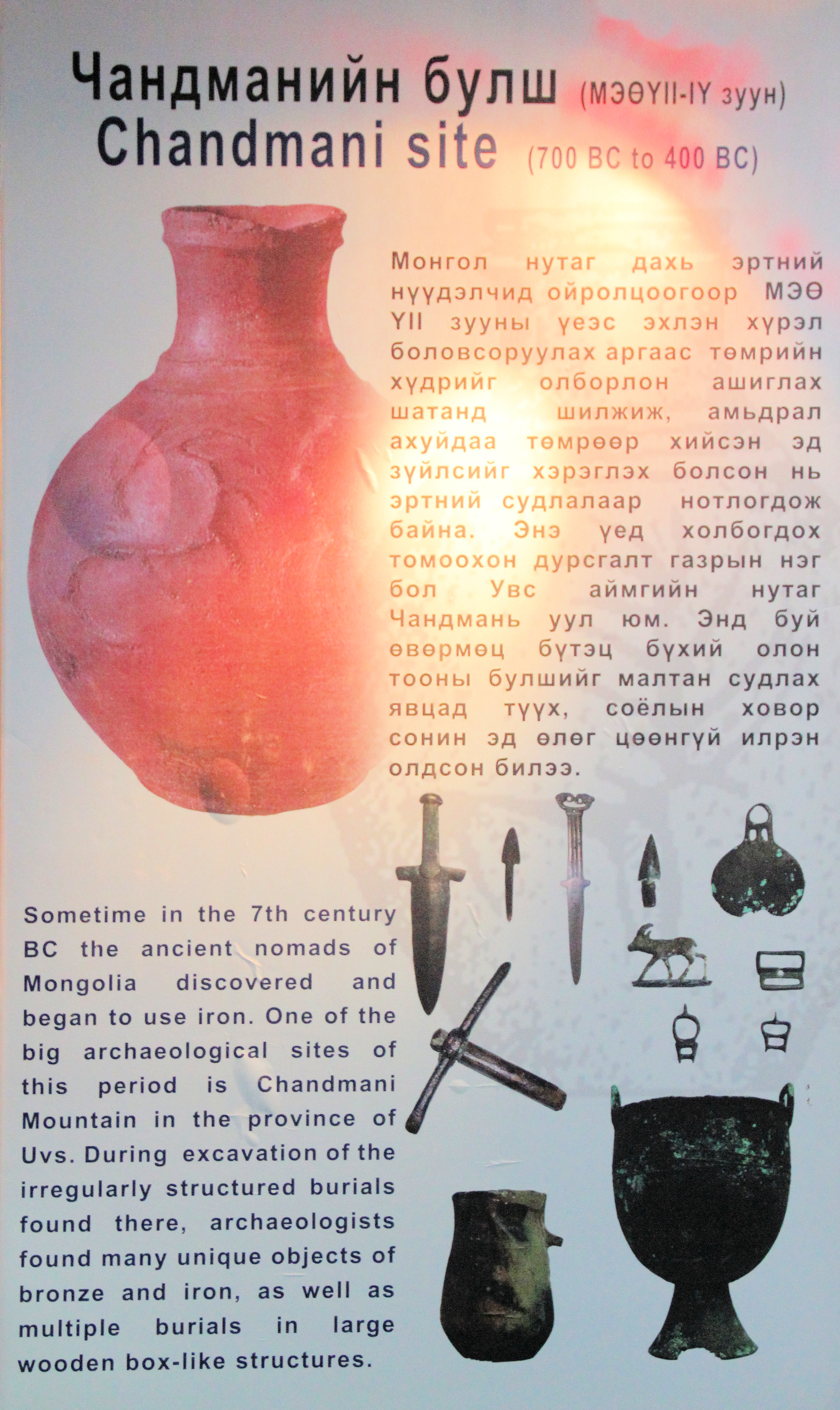
Notice about the site of Chandman, National Museum of Mongolia

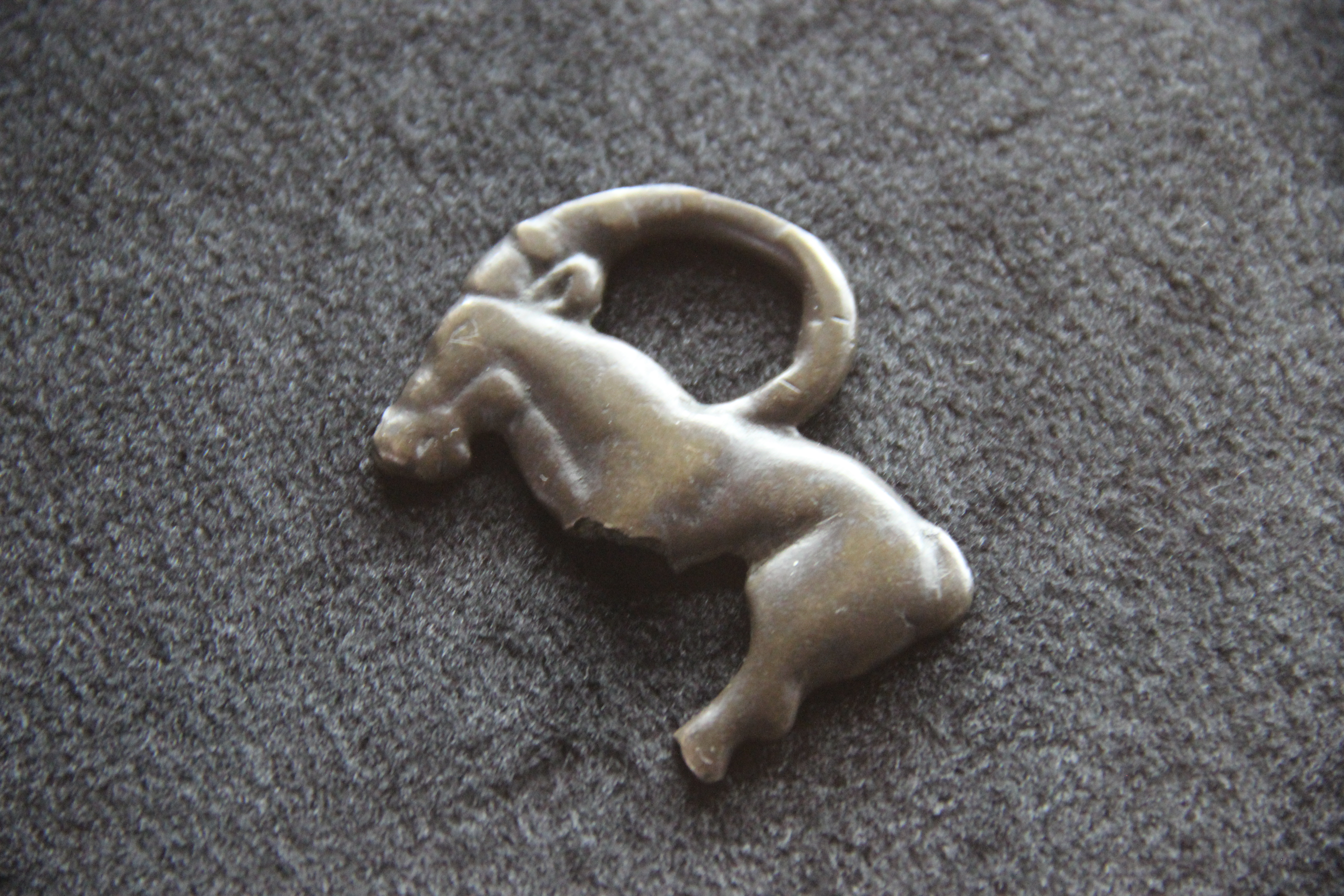
Bronze goat ornament, 700–300 BCE, Uvs Province, National Museum of Mongolia

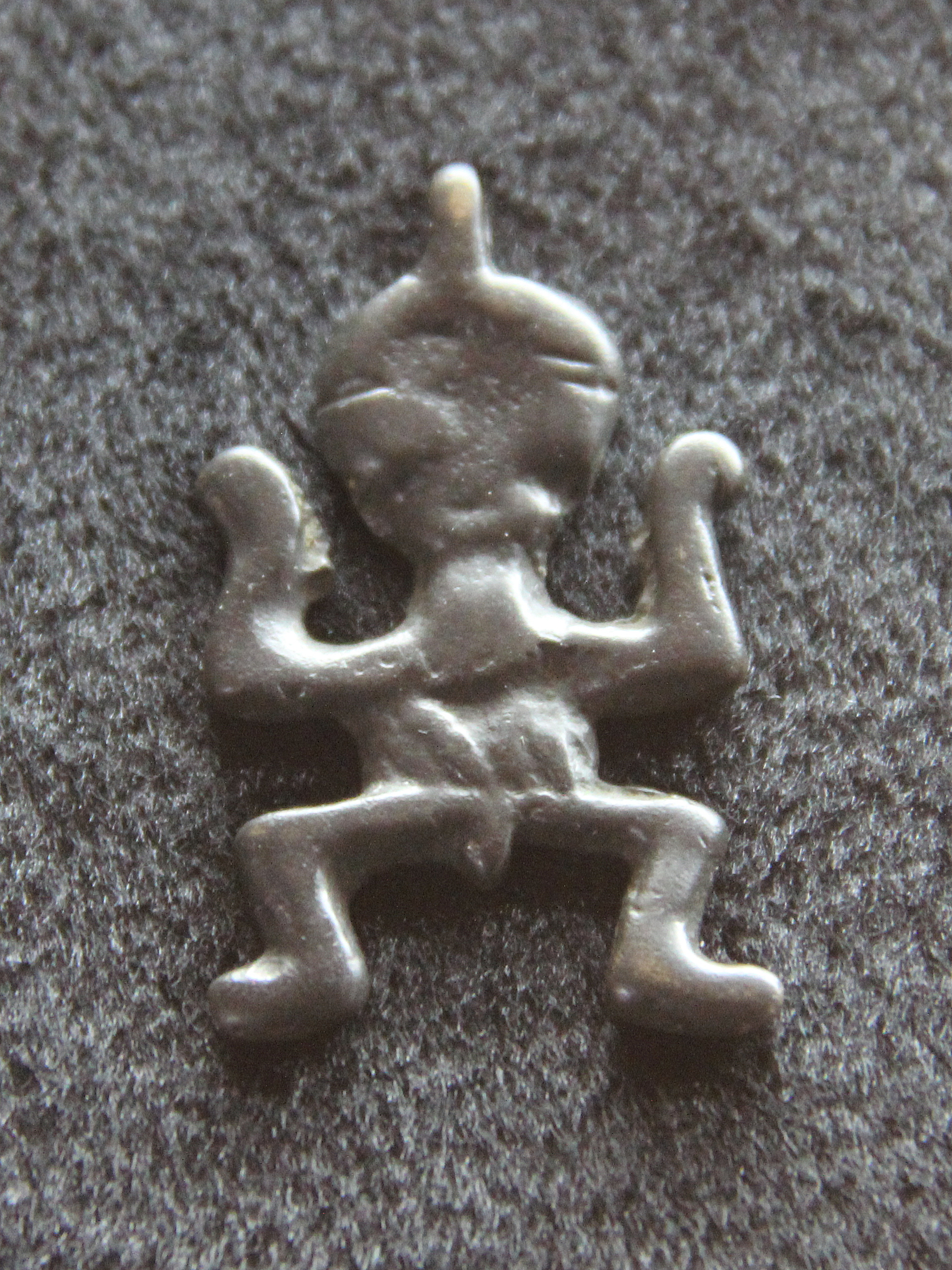
Bronze ornament, 700–300 BCE, Uvs Province, National Museum of Mongolia

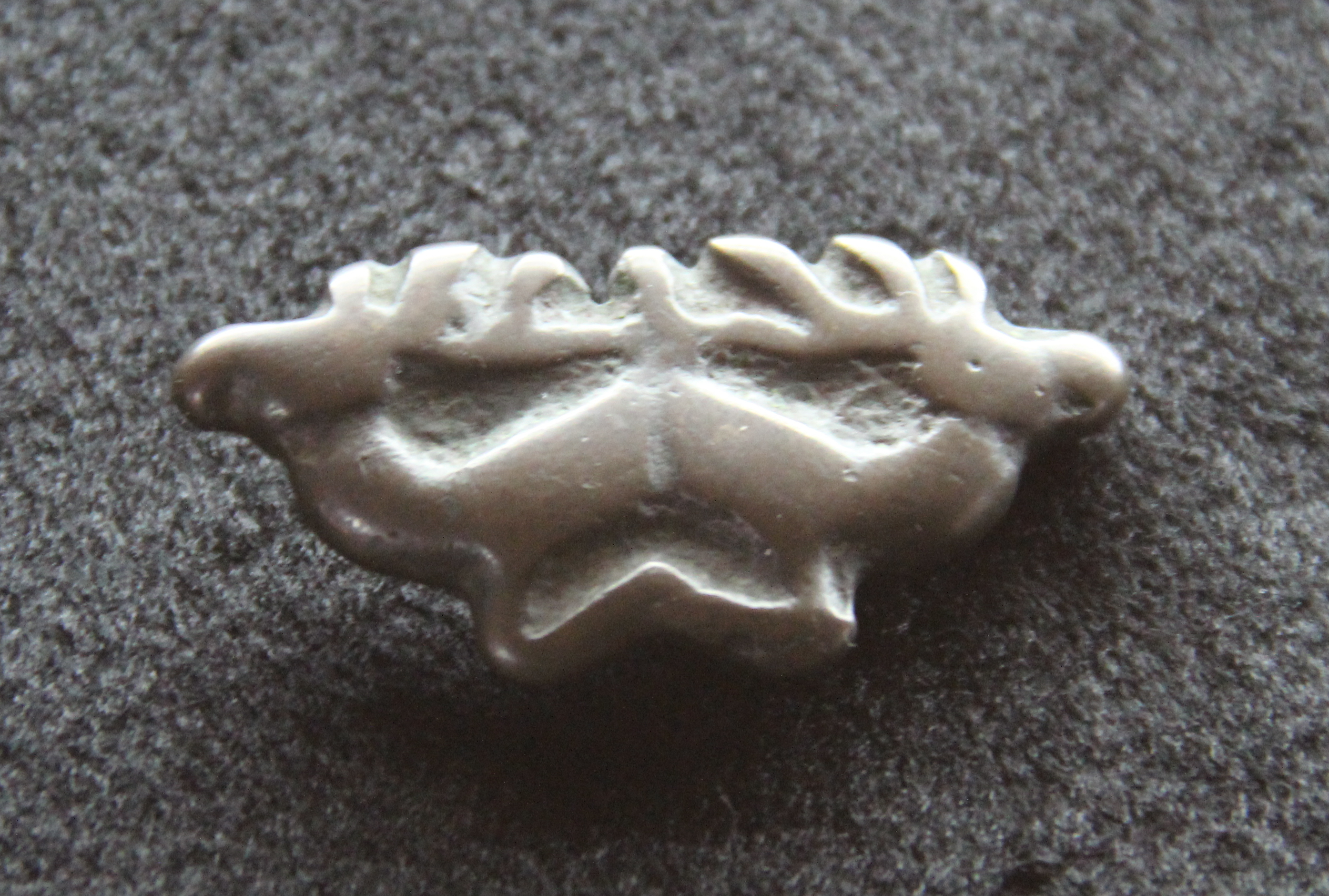
Bronze ornament, 700–300 BCE, Uvs Province, National Museum of Mongolia

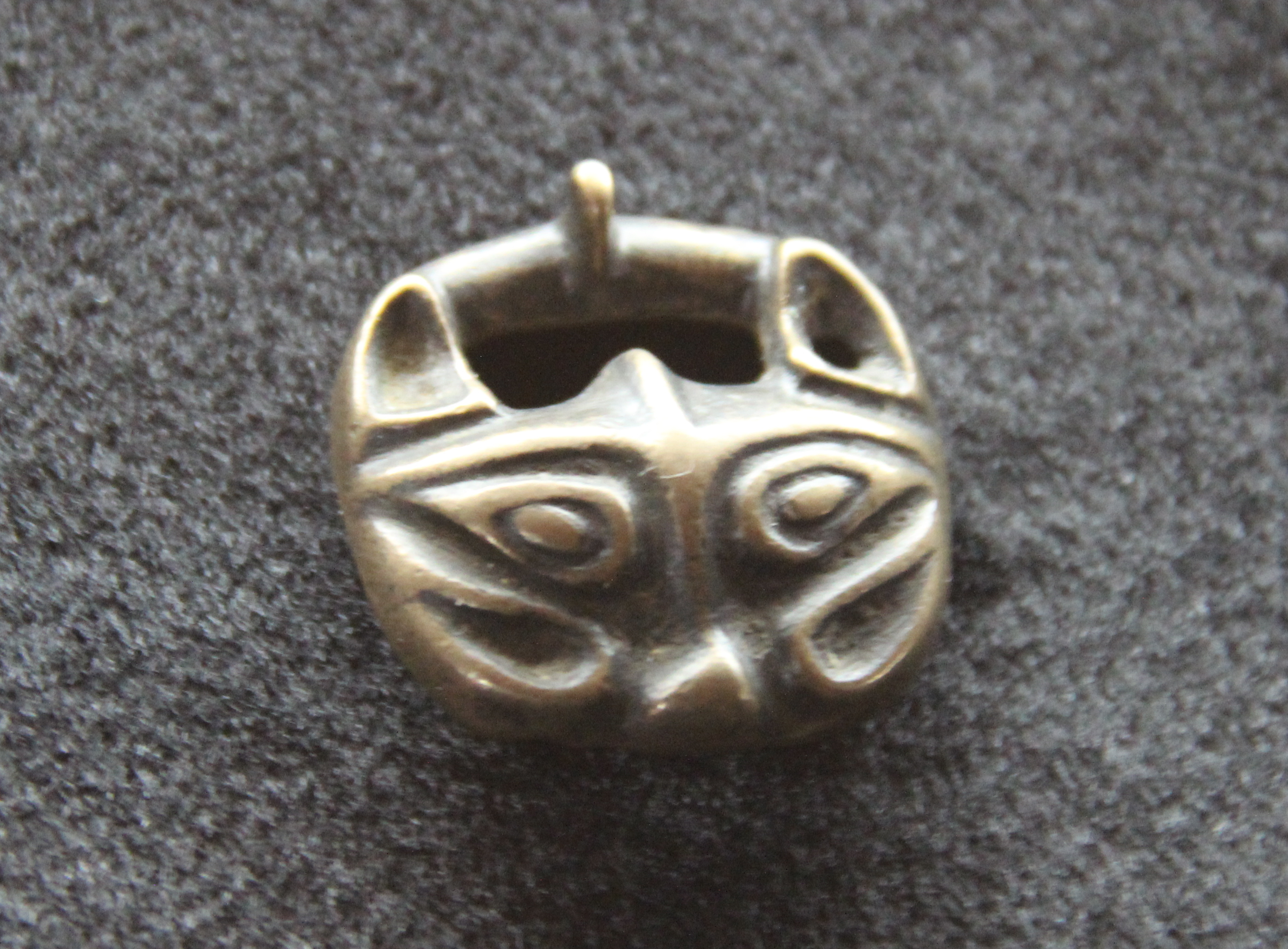
Bronze ornament, 700–300 BCE, Uvs Province, National Museum of Mongolia

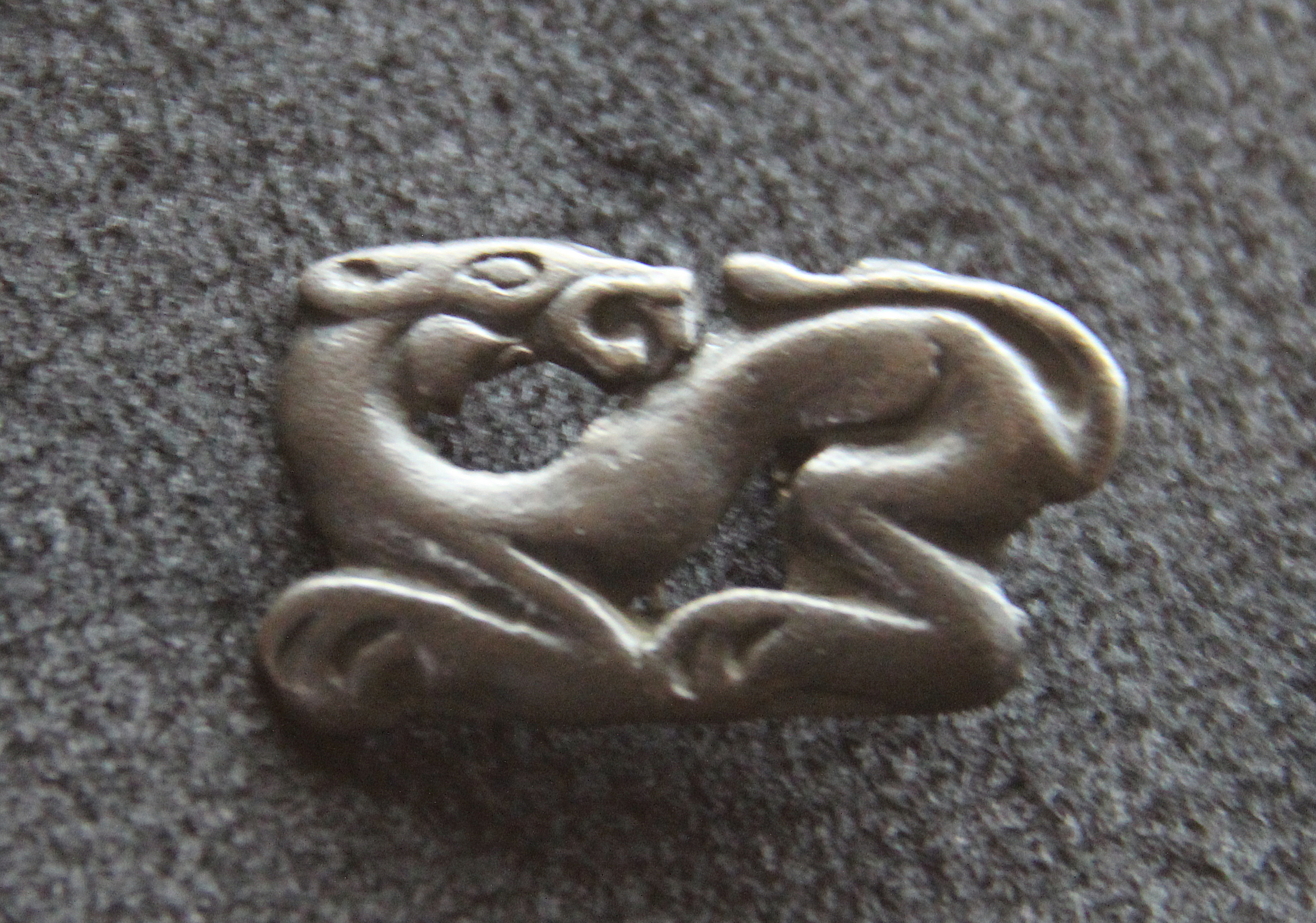
Bronze ornament, 700–300 BCE, Uvs Province, National Museum of Mongolia

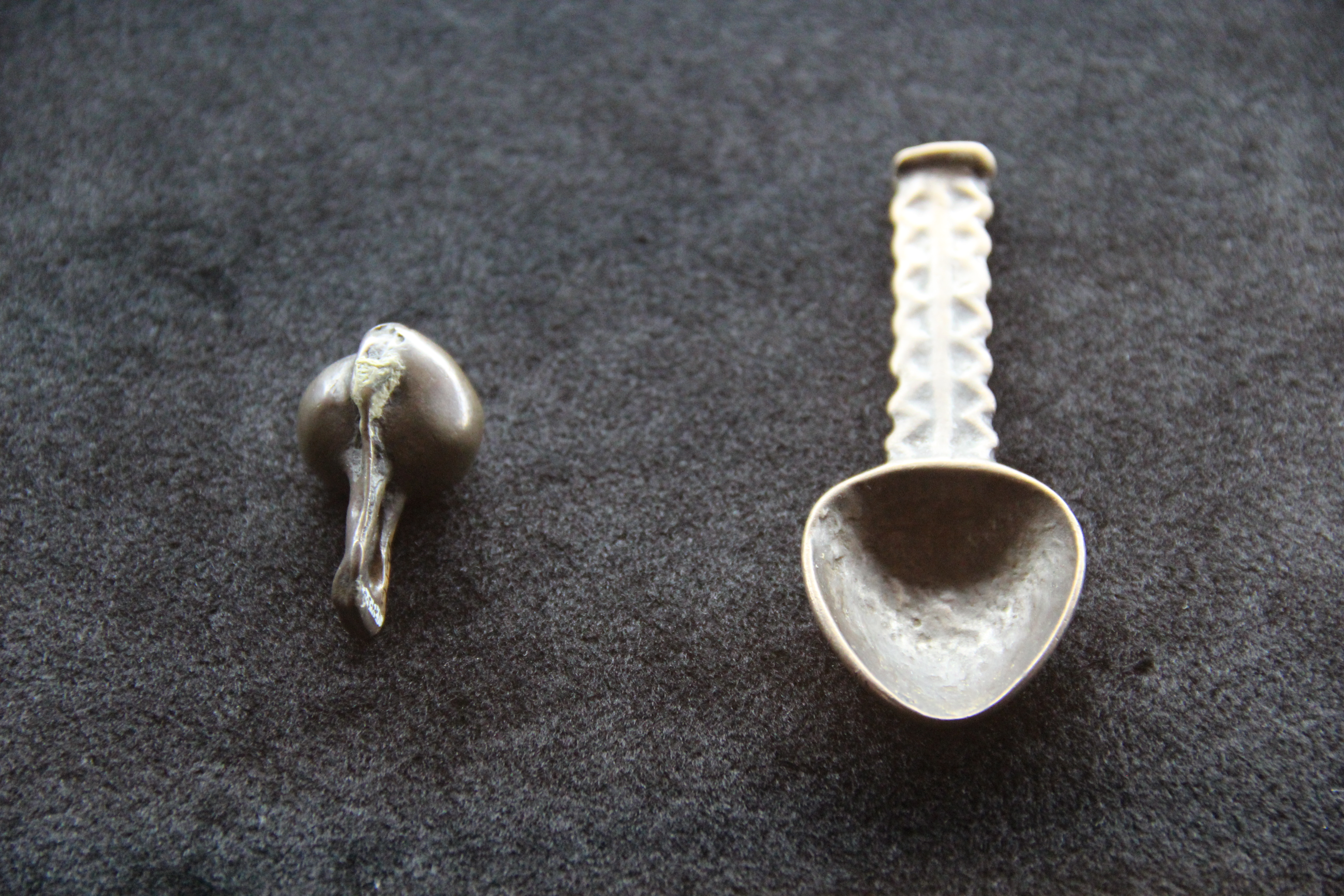
Bronze ornament, 700–300 BCE, Uvs Province, National Museum of Mongolia

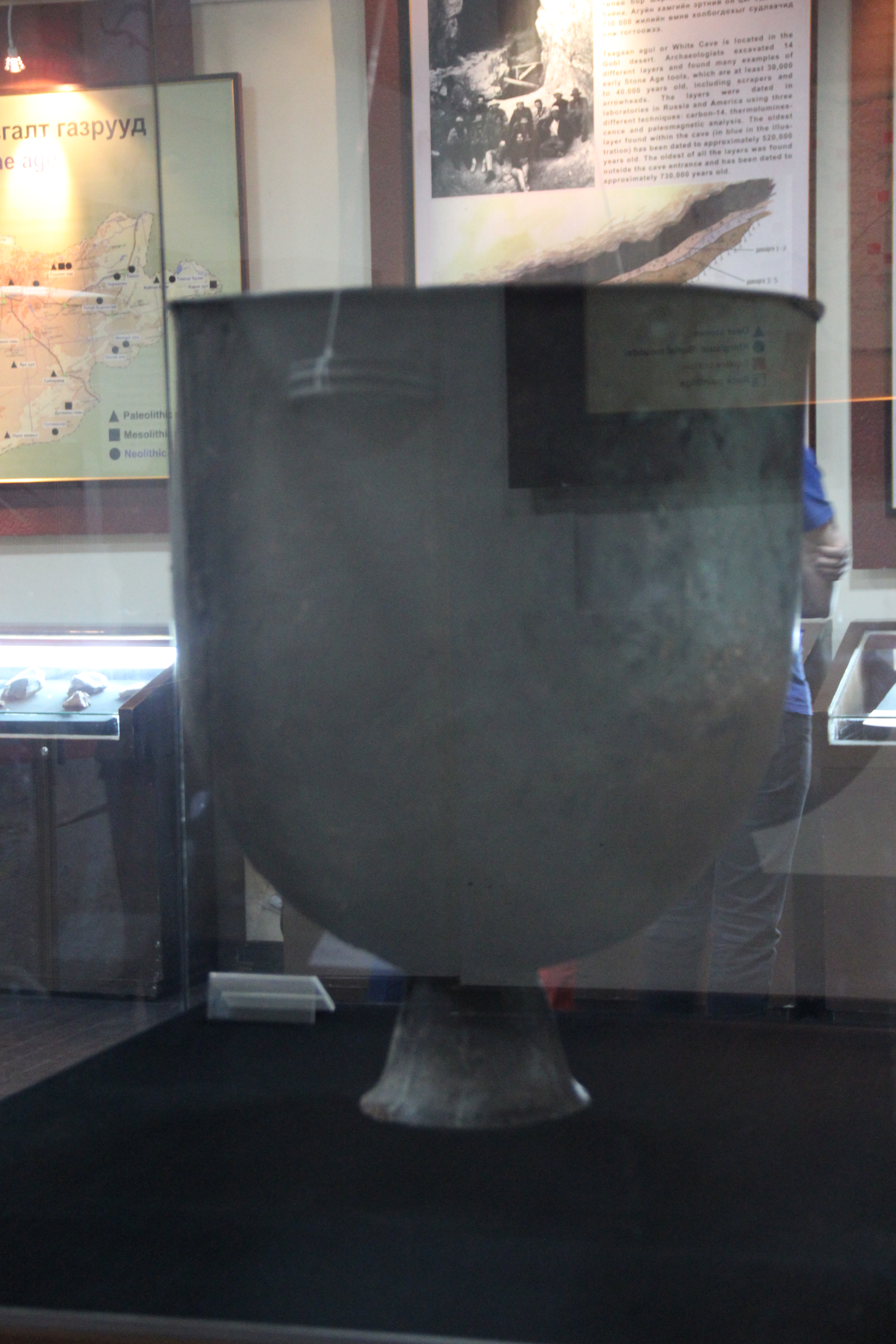
Bronze cauldron from Kharmaan River, Khuvsgul aimag, 700–300 BCE, National Museum of Mongolia. Style originated in China in the 8th century BCE, and then spread to western Asia.

== See also ==
- Sagly culture
