= Slab-grave culture =

Archaeological culture of ancient East Asians

Slab Grave culture
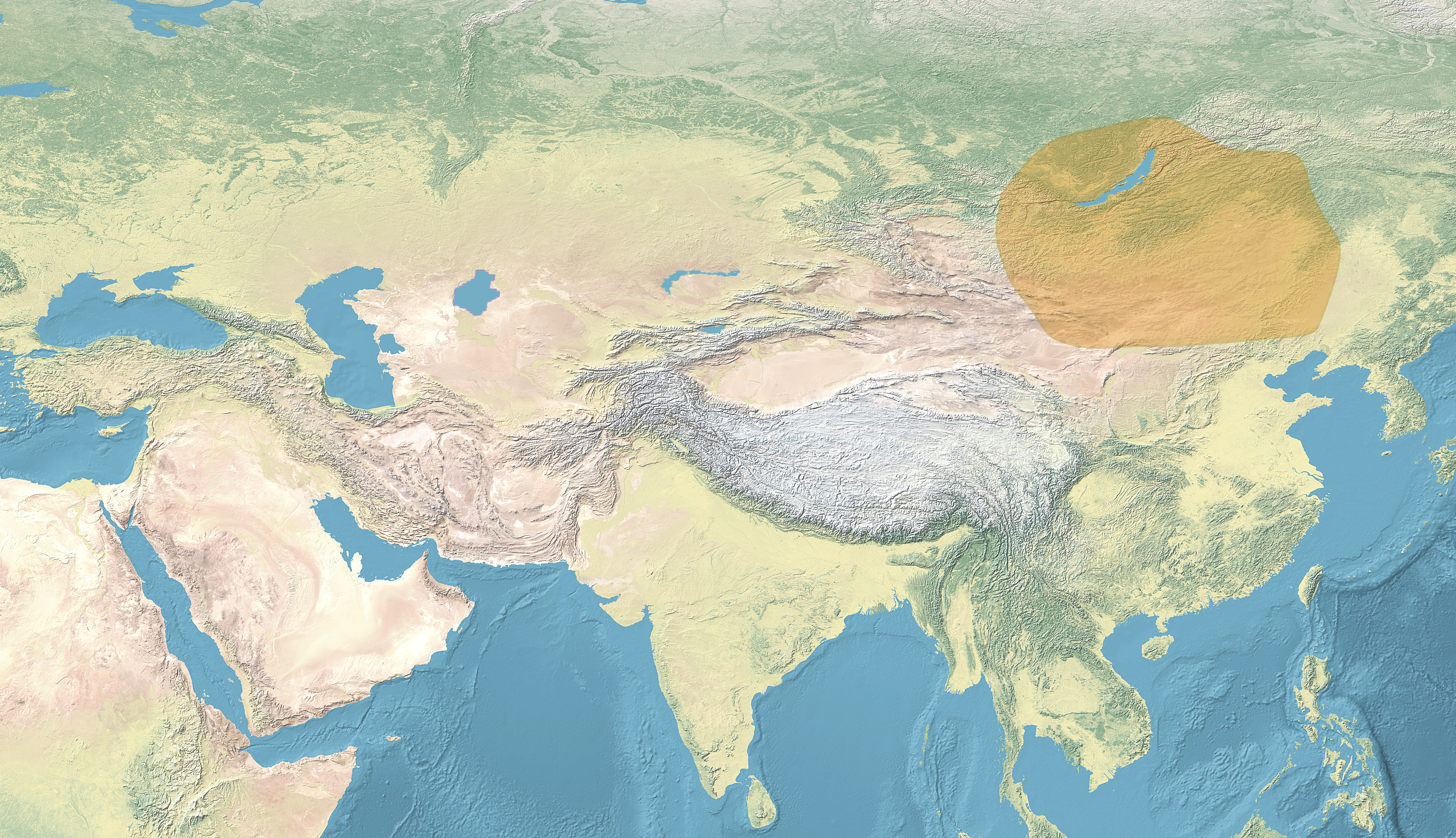
- The Slab Grave culture and contemporary cultures c. 500 BC
- Geographical range: Mongolia, South Siberia
- Period: Bronze Age, Iron Age
- Dates: 1300 (Transbaikal) 700 (Mongolia) – 300 BC
- Preceded by: Ulaanzuukh culture, Deer stones culture
- Followed by: Xiongnu Empire

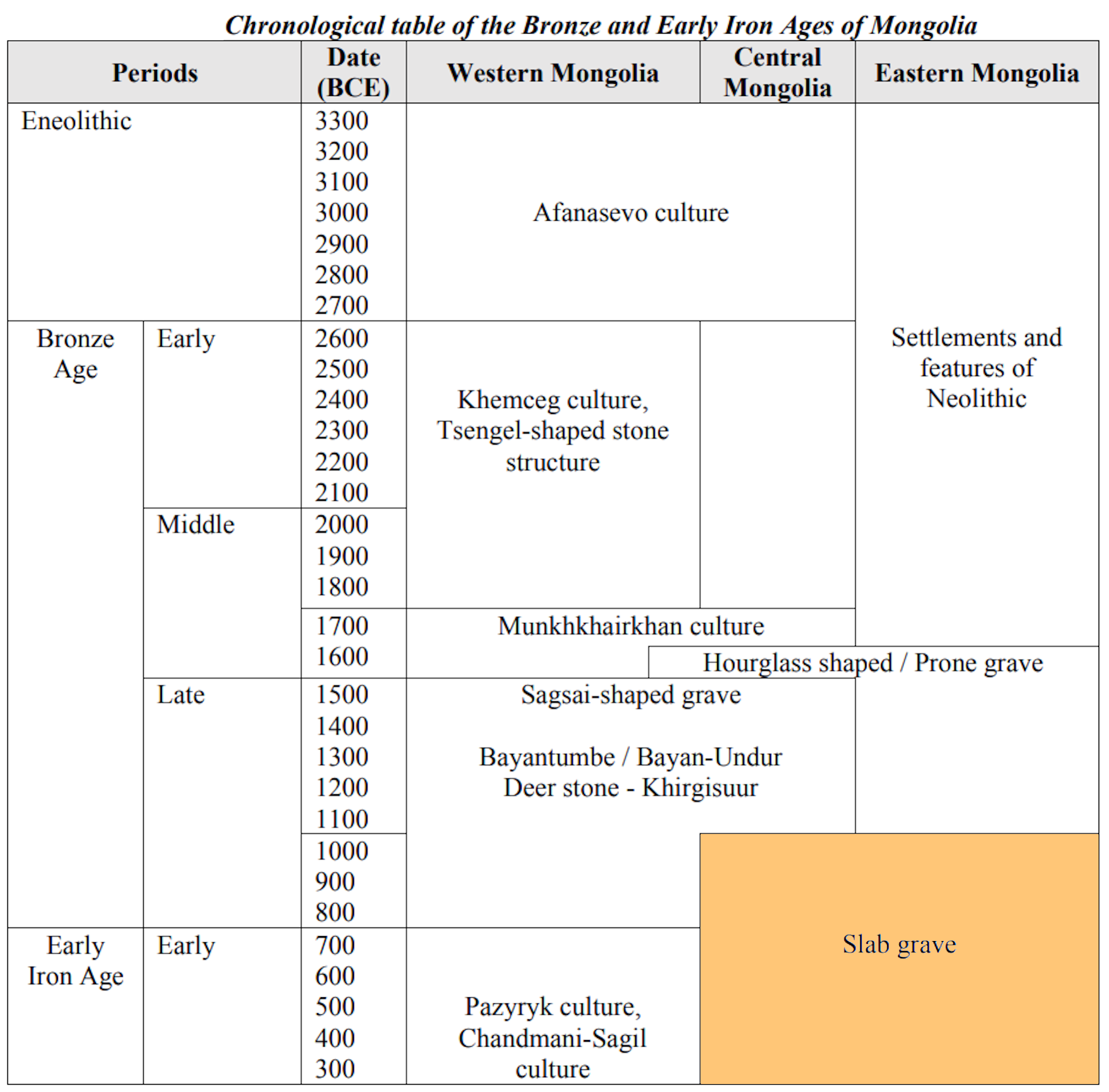
Chronological table of the Bronze and Early Iron Ages of Mongolia.

The Slab Grave culture is an archaeological culture of Late Bronze Age (LBA) and Early Iron Age Mongolia. The Slab Grave culture formed one of the primary ancestral components of the succeeding Xiongnu, as revealed by genetic evidence. The ethnogenesis of Turkic peoples and Mongolic peoples is, at least partially, linked to the Slab Grave culture by historical and archaeological evidence and further corroborated by genetic research on Slab Grave remains.

The Slab Grave culture is dated from 1300 to 300 BC. The origin of the Slab Grave culture is not definitively known, however, genetic evidence is consistent with multiple hypotheses of a local origin dating back to at least the Bronze Age. In particular, the people of the Ulaanzuukh culture and the Slab Grave culture are closely linked to the westward expansion of Neolithic Amur ancestry associated with Ancient Northeast Asians. The genetic profiles of individuals from the Ulaanzuukh LBA and the Slab Grave culture are identical, which is in agreement with the archaeological hypothesis that the Slab Grave culture emerged from the Ulaanzuukh.

To the west and northwest, the Slab Grave culture was adjacent to, and essentially contemporaneous with, the Deer stones culture of primarily Khövsgöl LBA ancestry, and various Saka cultures such as the Tagar culture, the Pazyryk culture and the Aldy-Bel culture for a period of several centuries. The Slab Grave culture was superseded by the Xiongnu culture, which formed a vast empire stretching across much of the Eurasian world, and saw the hybridization of Scytho-Siberian and Eastern Steppe populations and cultures.

== Nomenclature ==
The term Slab Grave culture describes the specific monumental burial architecture that is encountered in an area from Transbaikalia to Mongolia, and is characterized by rectangular box-like burials composed of large slabs placed on edge around the burial pit. The word slab burial (Russian: плиточная могила, German: Plattengrab) was first coined in this context by the Russian archaeologist Gregorii Borovka.

== Area ==
Slab Grave cultural monuments are found in northern, central and eastern Mongolia, Inner Mongolia, Northwest China (Xinjiang region, Qilian Mountains etc.), Manchuria, Lesser Khingan, Buryatia, southern Irkutsk Oblast and southern and central Zabaykalsky Krai.

The most recent graves date from the 6th century BC, and the earliest monuments of the next in time Xiongnu culture belong to the 2nd century BC.

== Burials ==
The slab graves are both individual and collective in groups of 5–8 to large burials with up to 350 fences. Large cemeteries have a clear plan. More than three thousand fences were found in Aga Buryat District. Most of the graves are burials, some are ritual fences – cenotaphs. Graves are oriented along west-east axis. Deceased are laid on the back, with the head to the east.

The fences vary from 1.5 to 9.6 m (4.9 to 31.5 ft), a height of the slabs vary from 0.5 to 3 m (1.6 to 9.8 ft). The grave pits under some kurgan mounds are covered with slabs that often are of considerable sizes. The depth of the burial pits vary from 0.6 to 3 m (2.0 to 9.8 ft), in deep graves the side slabs were stacked and covered with several slab layers. In places within the fence sometimes deer stones, were installed which are single slabs with images of deer, less frequently of horses, accompanied with solar signs and armaments.

A burial complex on the Lami mountain in the Nerchinsk area consisted of graves about 30 m (98 ft) in length, divided into 4 sections. A not plundered fences was covered by several slabs each weighing up to half a ton. Under cover slabs was an altar with skulls of horses, cows and sheep. Below were five burial chambers for inhumation.

Most of the graves were looted. The buried clothing and footwear is colorful, with various ornaments of bronze, bone and stone: plaques, buttons, necklaces, pendants, mirrors, cowrie shells. The accompanying tools are rare: Needles and needle beds, knives and axes-celts. Even less common are weapons: arrowheads, daggers, bow end caps. Some graves contain horse harnesses and whip handles. There are bronze objects, and fewer made of iron and precious metals.

Jars are round-bottom earthenware, some tripods. Vessels are ornamented with impressions, rolled bands and indentations. The art of the Slab Grave culture belongs to the "animal style" art that depicts domesticated and wild animals, daily life and main occupations. The Slab Grave culture art has many common features with cultures of Southern Siberia: Karasuk, Tagar, and others.

=== Graves in Baikal area ===
Thousands of graves can now be seen in the southern Baikal area. In some cases they form a cemetery, with a clear plan and a strict order. For example, at lake Balzino about a hundred graves formed circles and rectangles. They are usually located at higher elevation, and exposed to sun. Monumental burials mark the greatness of the people who once lived there. They became an integral part of the East Baikal steppes cultural and historical landscape. Slab Grave burials frequently reused stone material from nearby Deer stones culture sites. The replacement of the Deer stones culture by the Slab Grave culture in central and eastern Mongolia around 700 BCE might mark a replacement of Caucasoid physical types by Mongoloid ones in the region. To the west, the Deer stone culture was replaced by, or evolved into, the various Saka cultures, such as the Uyuk culture and the Chandman culture and the Pazyryk culture.

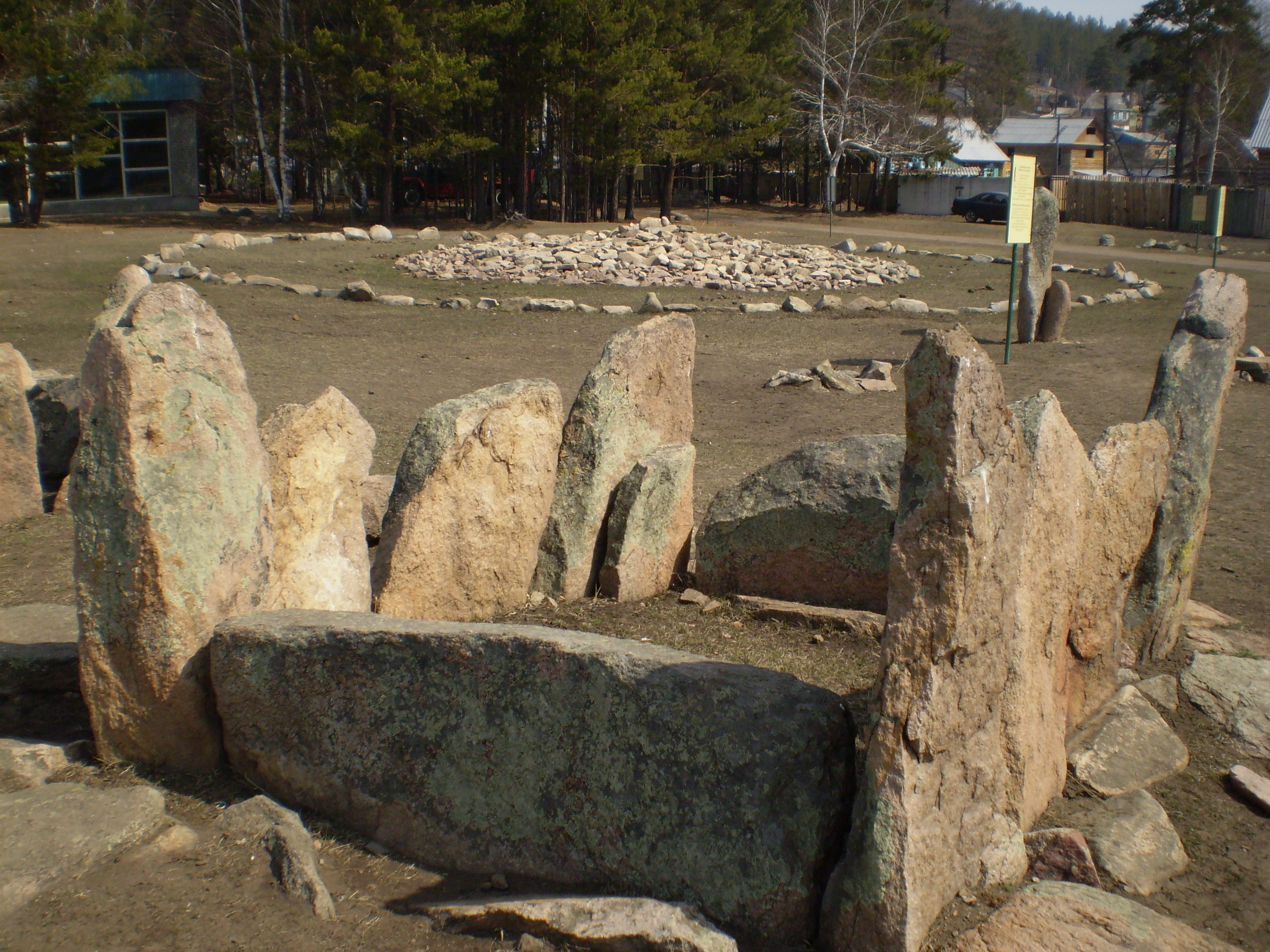
Slab grave. Exhibit in Ethnography Museum of E. Baikal peoples. Relocated from Horin region of Buryatia

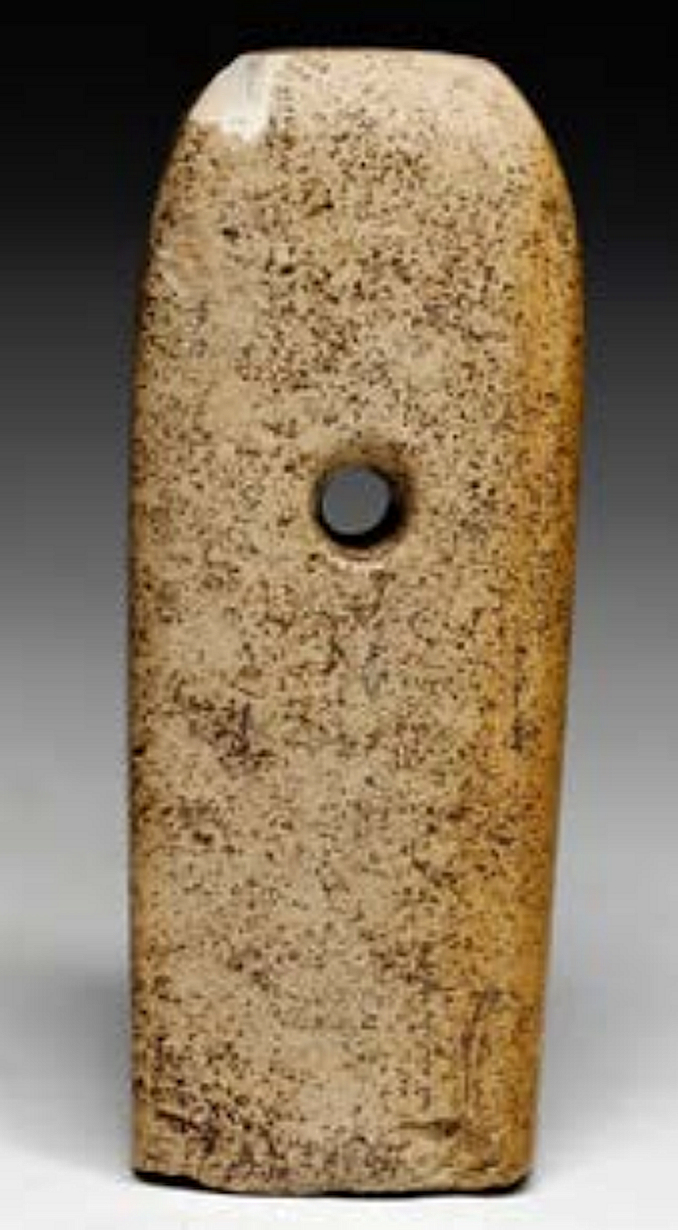
Slab grave whetstone, Daram mountain, Eastern Mongolia.

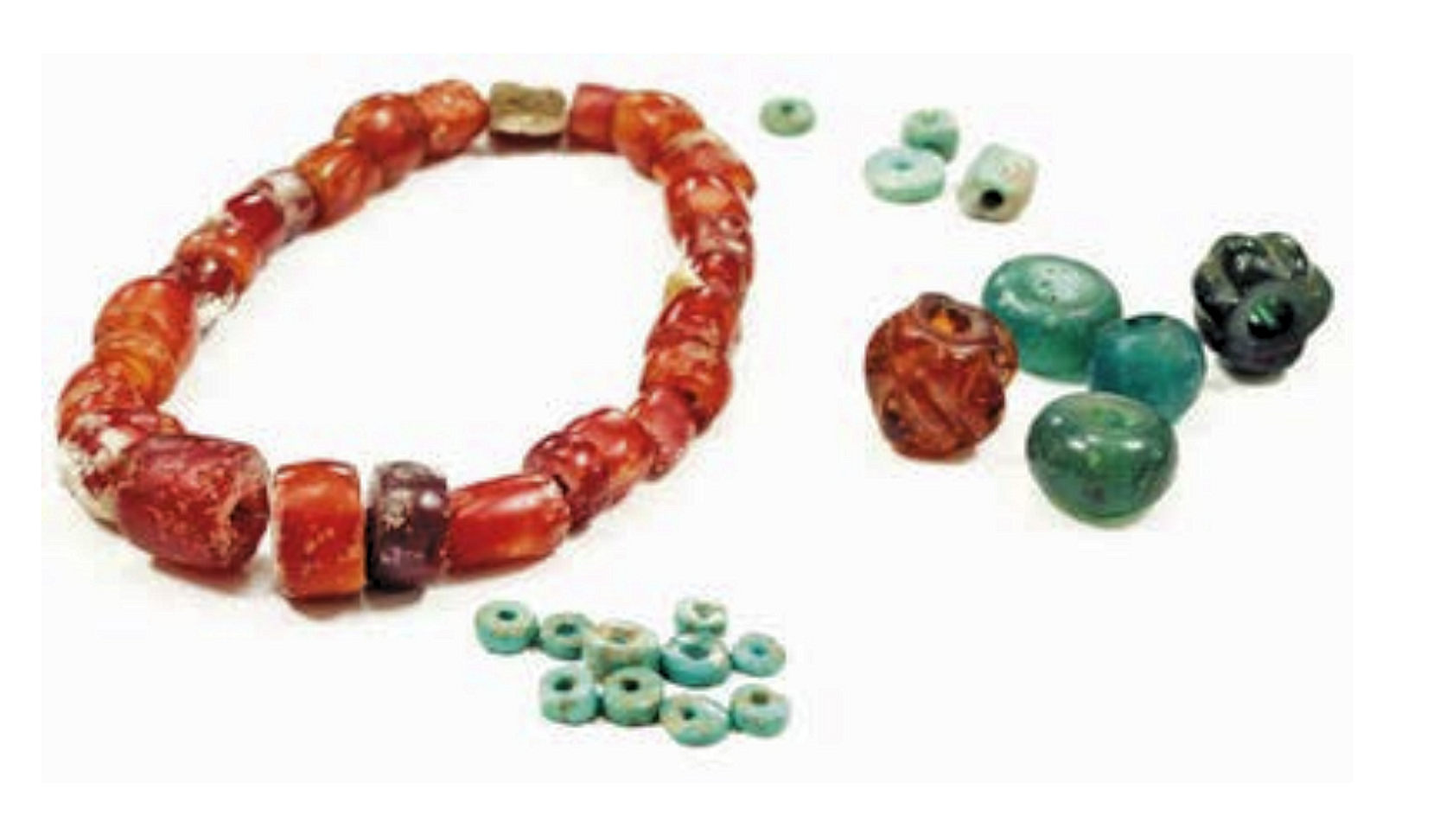
Slab grave stone beads, Mongolia

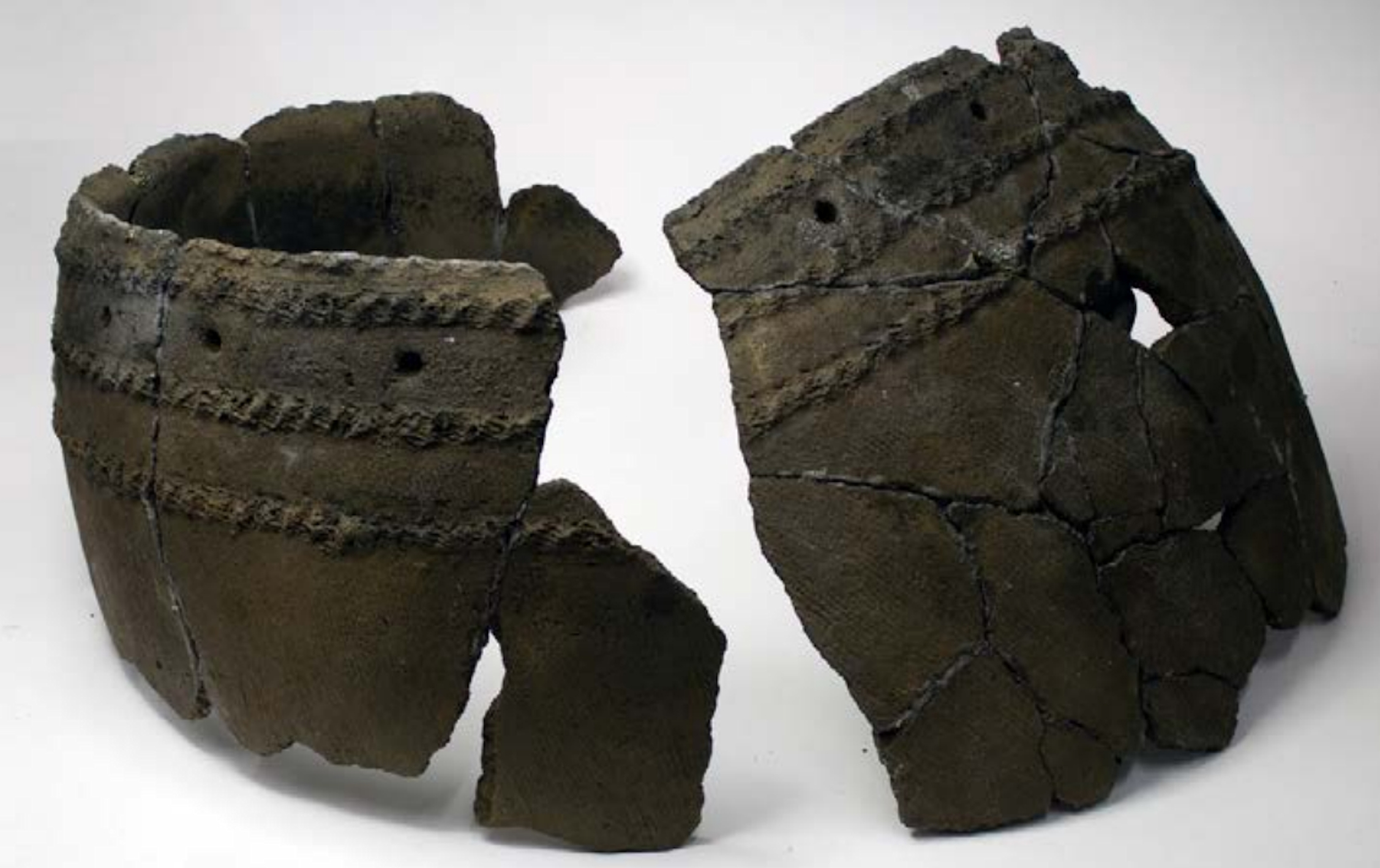
Slab grave pottery, Narst, Bulgan, Northern Mongolia

== Archaeogenetics ==
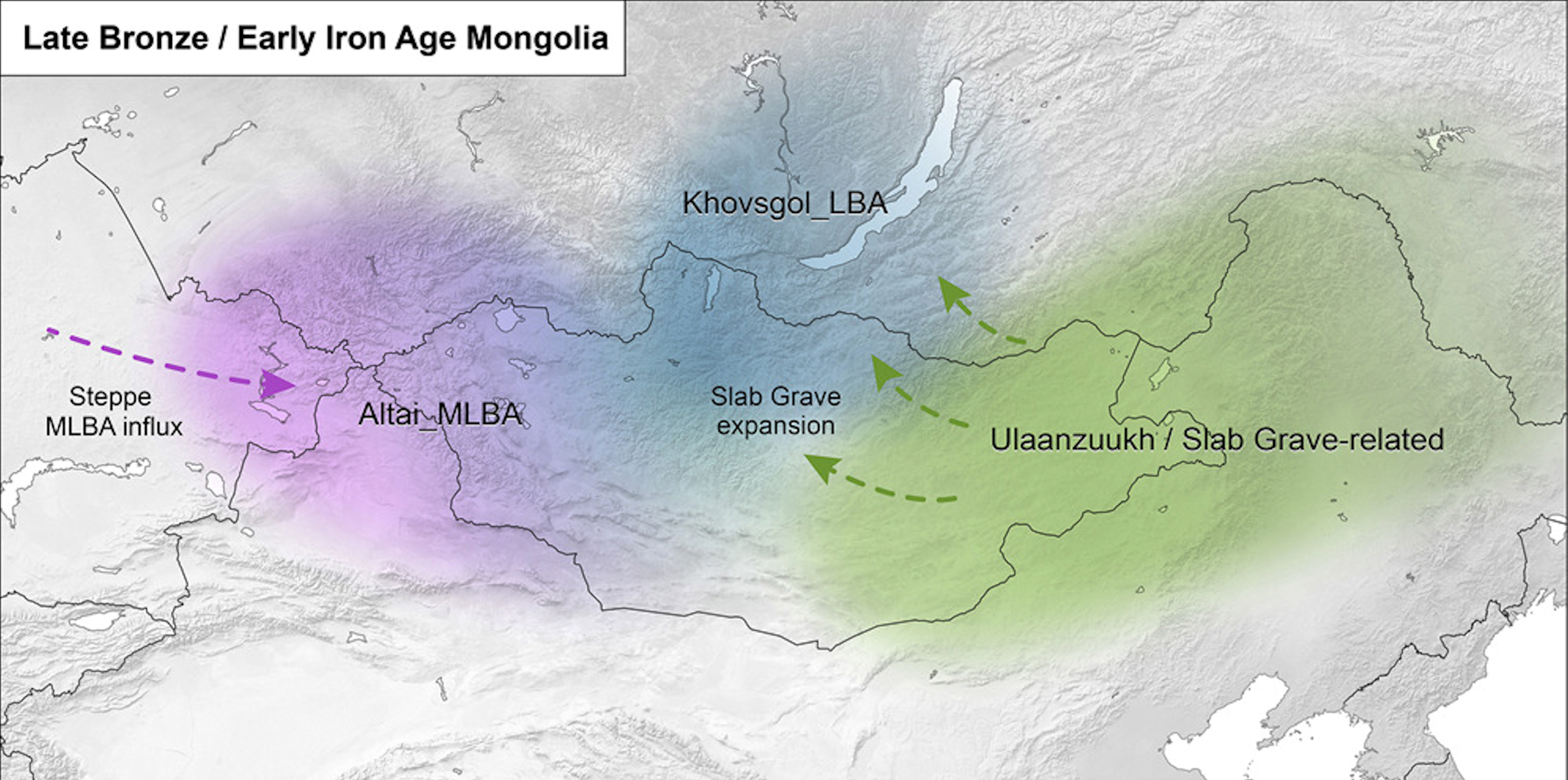
From around 700 BCE, in the Early Iron Age, the Slab-grave culture ( ) expanded into central Mongolia and took over Deer stones sites. In southern Siberia and western Mongolia, the Classical Saka culture ( ) started to flourish.

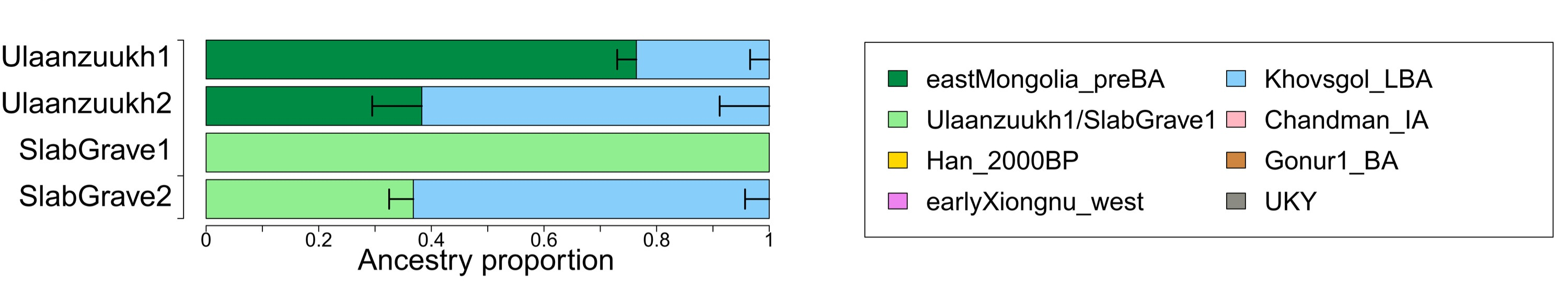
qpAdm model of Ulaanzuukh and Slab Grave remains: Ulaanzuukh and SlabGrave individuals are modeled as the mixture between Ancient Northeast Asian (ANA/Amur_N), represented by eastMongolia_preBA in this study, and Khövsgöl_LBA (Baikal_EBA HG).

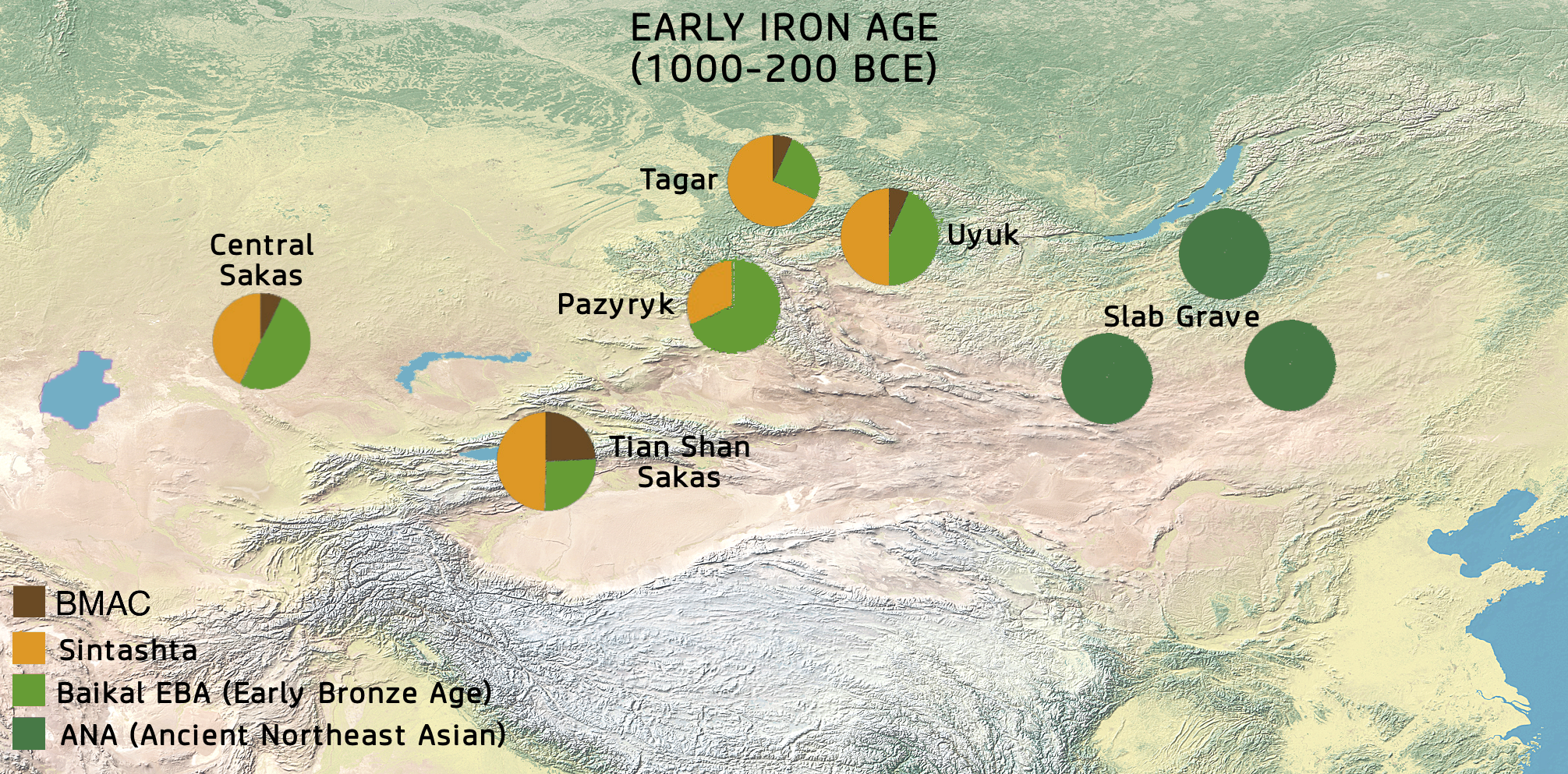
Early Iron Age Southern Siberian genetic ancestries. The Slab-grave people are uniformly of Ancient Northeast Asian (ANA, ) origin, while Saka populations to the west combined Sintashta, BMAC and Ancient Northeast Asian (Baikal EBA) ancestry.

Autosomal genetic evidence from several Slab Grave remains suggests that they were largely derived from Ancient Northeast Asians, specifically from Neolithic Amur populations. They largely replaced the previous Neolithic and Early Bronze Age Baikal hunter-gatherers, although geneflow between them has been proposed, particularly between a Neolithic Eastern Mongolian population (East_Mongolia_preBA) with primarily Amur_N-like ancestry and a local Late Bronze Age population (Khövsgöl_LBA) associated with the Deer stones culture. While the majority of Slab Grave remains were of primarily Neolithic Amur ancestry, some Slab Grave remains displayed mixed ancestry between Neolithic Amur and pre-existing Khövsgöl/Baikal hunter-gatherers, consistent with the proposed expansion of Ulaanzuukh/Slab Grave ancestry north and westwards and archaeological evidence. Local Neolithic to Bronze Age Baikal hunter-gatherers and Khövsgöl herders associated with the Deer Stones culture themselves were of primarily Ancient Northern East Asian ancestry, and are inferred to have expanded prior to the dispersal of Neolithic Amur-associated groups from further east. As the Khövsgöl herders harbored only limited western mixture (4–7%) from Sintashta or Afanasievo sources, it is argued that the adaption of dairy pastoralism was via cultural transmission rather than by mixture.

Genetic data indicates that the Slab Grave culture, in conjunction with the Chandman culture, gave rise to the succeeding Xiongnu confederation. Although early Xiongnu displayed a substructured genetic makeup, a differentiation based on social class is possible: While retainers of low status mainly displayed ancestry related to the Chandman/Uyuk culture or various combinations of Chandman/Uyuk and Ancient Northeast Asian Ulaanzuukh/Slab Grave profiles, high status Xiongnu individuals tended to have less genetic diversity, and their ancestry was essentially derived from the Ulaanzuukh/Slab Grave culture.

The analysis of the ancient genome of Empress Ashina, a ruler of the clan of the Göktürks, was shown to display close genetic affinities with the Slab Grave and Ulaanzuukh culture remains.

=== Paternal haplogroups ===
All eight currently sequenced Slab Grave males have been identified as belonging to East Eurasian paternal haplogroups. The predominant Y-DNA haplogroup in Slab Grave males has been identified as Q (5/8 Q-M120 and 1/8 Q-L330), with a minority belonging to N-M231 (2/8).

The transition from the Slab Grave culture period to the Xiongnu period was characterized as a massive increase of West Eurasian paternal ancestry, rising from 0% to 46%, which was not accompanied by increased West Eurasian maternal ancestry. This may be consistent with an aggressive expansion of males with West Eurasian paternal ancestry, or possibly marriage alliances that favored such people. According to Rogers and Kaestle (2022), these two scenarios are not necessarily mutually exclusive, but more data is needed to concisely explain why such an increase took place.

=== Maternal haplogroups ===
Slab Grave maternal lineages were more diverse, with 64-72% being of East Eurasian origin (such as A, B, C, D, F, M, G, and Z), while approximately 28–36% were of West Eurasian origin (such as K, J, and H).

East Eurasian maternal lineages in the Slab Grave population can be easily traced to Transbaikalian neolithic agriculturalists. On the other hand, West Eurasian maternal lineages are believed to have complex origins, with many tracing back to ancient hunter gatherers who mixed with early agriculturalists in the early Holocene period, or to middle eastern agriculturalists who expanded eastward after the advent of sheep herding. Others could be linked to much later Bronze Age populations such as Afanasievo or Scythians. The complex diversity of West Eurasian ancestral lineages in the Slab Grave population makes it difficult to pinpoint their exact origin.

== See also ==
- Animal Style
- Deer stone
- History of Mongolia
- History of Asia
- Lower Xiajiadian culture
- Ordos culture
- Xiongnu
- Xianbei

== Literature ==
- Borovka G.I., "Archaeological surveys of the river Tola", in the book: Northern Mongolia, Vol. 2, Leningrad, 1927;
- Dikov N.N., "Bronze Age in E.Baikal", Ulan-Ude, 1958
- Fitzhugh, W. W. (1 January 2009b). "Stone Shamans and Flying Deer of Northern Mongolia: Deer Goddess of Siberia or Chimera of the Steppe?". Arctic Anthropology. 46 (1–2): 72–88. doi:10.1353/arc.0.0025. ISSN 0066-6939. S2CID 55632271.
- Grishin S. "Bronze and early Iron Age of the E.Baikal", Moscow, 1975
- Konstantinov A.V., Konstantinova N.N. "History of E. Baikal (from ancient times to 1917)", Chita-2002.
- Kirillov O.I., Stavpetskaya M.N., "Religious and ritual structures of E.Baikal pastoralists in 1st millennia BC", //Young Archaeology and Ethnology oid Siberia, Chita, 1999, Vol. 1.
- Kiselev S.V., "Mongolia in ancient times", "Bulletin of USSR Akademy", Series History and Philosophy, 1947, Vol. 4
- Okladnikov A.P., Kirillov I.I., "South-East E.Baikal in the Stone Age and Early Bronze Age", Novosibirsk, 1980
- Tsibiktarov A.D. "Slab Grave Culture graves of Mongolia and E.Baikal", Ulan-Ude, 1998
- D. Tumen. Anthropology of Archaeological Populations from Northeast Asia :user.dankook.ac.kr/~oriental/Journal/pdf_new/49/11.pdf
