= Tashtyk culture =

Iron Age archaeological culture in Siberia

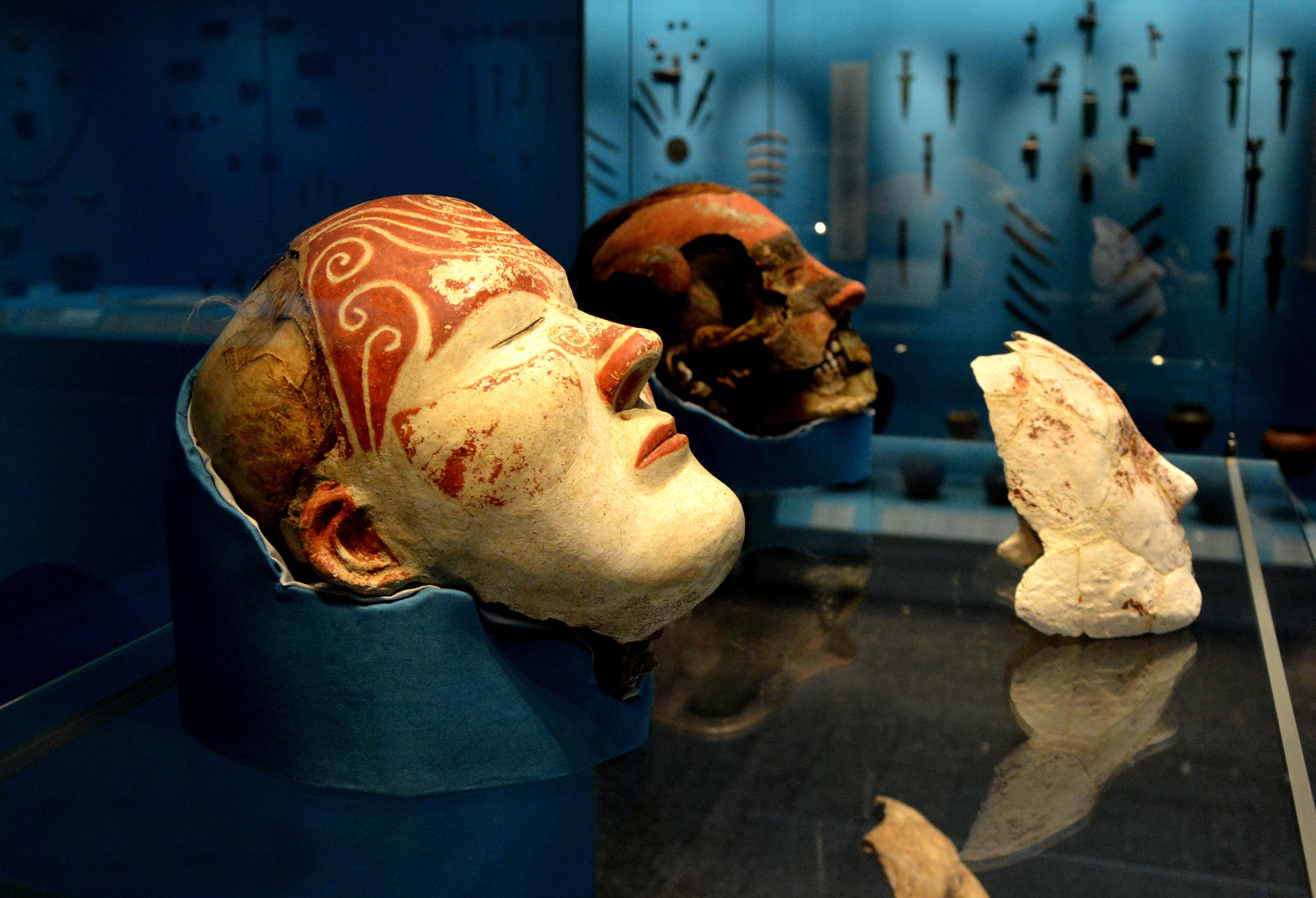
- Location of the Tashtyk culture (Minusinsk Depression) and contemporary Asian polities c. 100 Tashtyk culture funeral masks. The masks were often painted. Oglakhty necropolis, tomb 4, 3rd-4th century CE. Hermitage Museum.
- Geographical range: South Central Siberia
- Period: Iron Age
- Dates: 1 CE–400 CE
- Preceded by: Tagar culture
- Followed by: Yenisei Kyrgyz

The Tashtyk culture (Note: /tɑːʃˈtɪk/; Russian: Таштыкская культура) was a Late Iron Age archaeological culture that flourished in the Yenisei valley in Siberia from the 1st century CE to the 4th century CE. Located in the Minusinsk Depression, environs of modern Krasnoyarsk, eastern part of Kemerovo Oblast, it was preceded by the Tagar culture and the Tesinsky culture.

== History ==
The Tashtyk culture was first surveyed by the Russian archaeologist Sergei Teploukhov. The Yenisei Kirghiz are often associated with the Tashtyk culture. Teploukhov suggested that it had been initially Indo-European dominated, only to become overcome by the Yenisei Kirghiz around the 3rd century AD.

Tashtyk settlements and hill-forts have been unearthed throughout the Yenisei region, particularly the Sayan canyon area. Their most imposing monuments were immense barrows-crypt structures; these have yielded large quantities of clay and metal vessels and ornaments. In addition, numerous petrographic carvings have been found. Some of the graves contained leather models of human bodies with their heads wrapped in tissue and brightly painted. Inside the models there were small leather bags probably symbolising the stomach and containing burned human bones. Scaled-down replicas of swords, arrows and quivers were placed nearby. The animal motifs of the Tashtyk belonged to the Scytho-Altaic style, while they were also under significant Chinese influence.

During his excavations of the Oglahty cemetery south of Minusinsk, Leonid Kyzlasov discovered a number of mummies with richly decorated plaster funerary masks showing Western Eurasian features, though this would not rule out some East Asian admixture, as revealed by ancient DNA (see below). There were also intact fur hats, silk clothes, and footwear (now in the Hermitage Museum, St. Petersburg).

=== Datation ===
Oglakhty is considered as "the key site of stage I of the Tashtyk culture." From the early 20th century, various dates have been proposed for the Tashtyk burials: 1st century BC-1st century CE, 1st-2nd century CE. From the 1990s, new proposals were made dating the Tashtyk burials to the 3rd–4th centuries CE. C-14 Wiggle-matching datation techniques, applied to wooden logs of tomb 4 at Oglakhty have confirmed a datation to the 3rd–4th centuries CE. Other post-Xiongnu cultures, such as the Kokel Culture have also been recorded nearby.

== Genetics ==
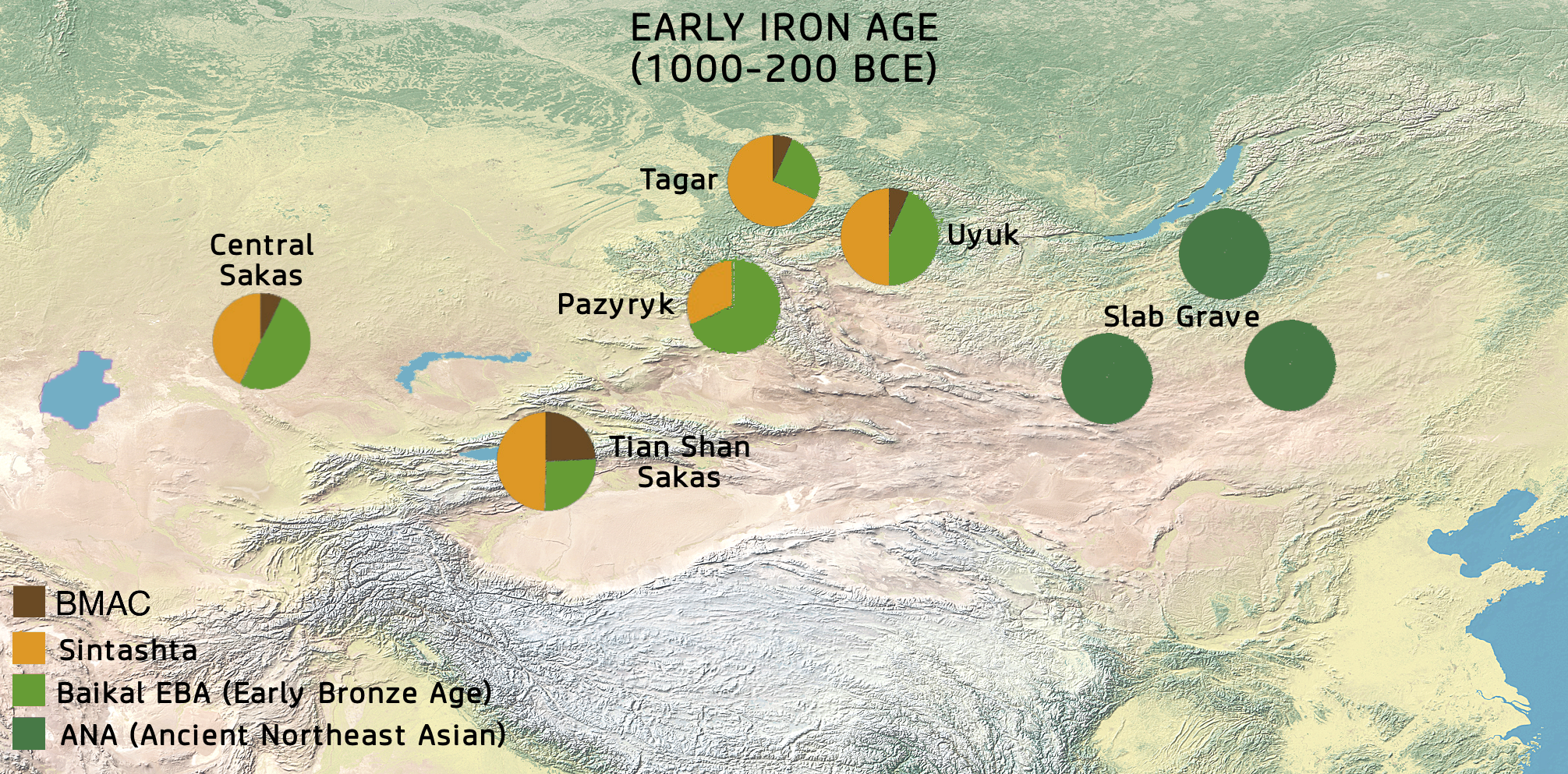
Early Iron Age Southern Siberian genetic ancestries. The Slab-grave people are uniformly of Ancient Northeast Asian origin, while Saka populations to the west combined Sintashta, BMAC and ancient Baikal ancestry.

In 2009, a genetic study covering specimens from the Tashtyk culture was published in Human Genetics. Six Tashtyk remains of 100–400 AD from Bogratsky region, Abakano-Pérévoz I, Khakassia were surveyed, of which 5 yielded genetic ancestry and pigmentation alleles.

All specimens examined were determined to be female. Extractions of mtDNA from three individuals resulted in their assignment to the Western Eurasian haplogroups HV, H, and T1, while the other two carried the East Asian haplogroups haplogroup C and N9a. Of the Tashtyk specimens which yielded pigmentation data, the majority (4) were predicted to have blue eyes and blond or light brown hair, including those with an Asian haplogroup. All specimens were determined to be of primarily European ancestry based on the analysis of 10 SNPs.

In a 2024 study, a full genome analysis on two Tashtyk individuals revealed high genetic affinity to the Saka Tagar culture, which derives around 70% from the Sintashta culture, 5% from the Bactria–Margiana Archaeological Complex, and 25% from Ancient Northeast Asian hunter-gatherers (Baikal_EBA). The sample of Y-DNA extracted belonged to haplogroup R1a1a, associated with the Indo-European migrations across Eurasia. The two samples of mtDNA extracted belonged to haplogroup I4a1.

== Gallery ==
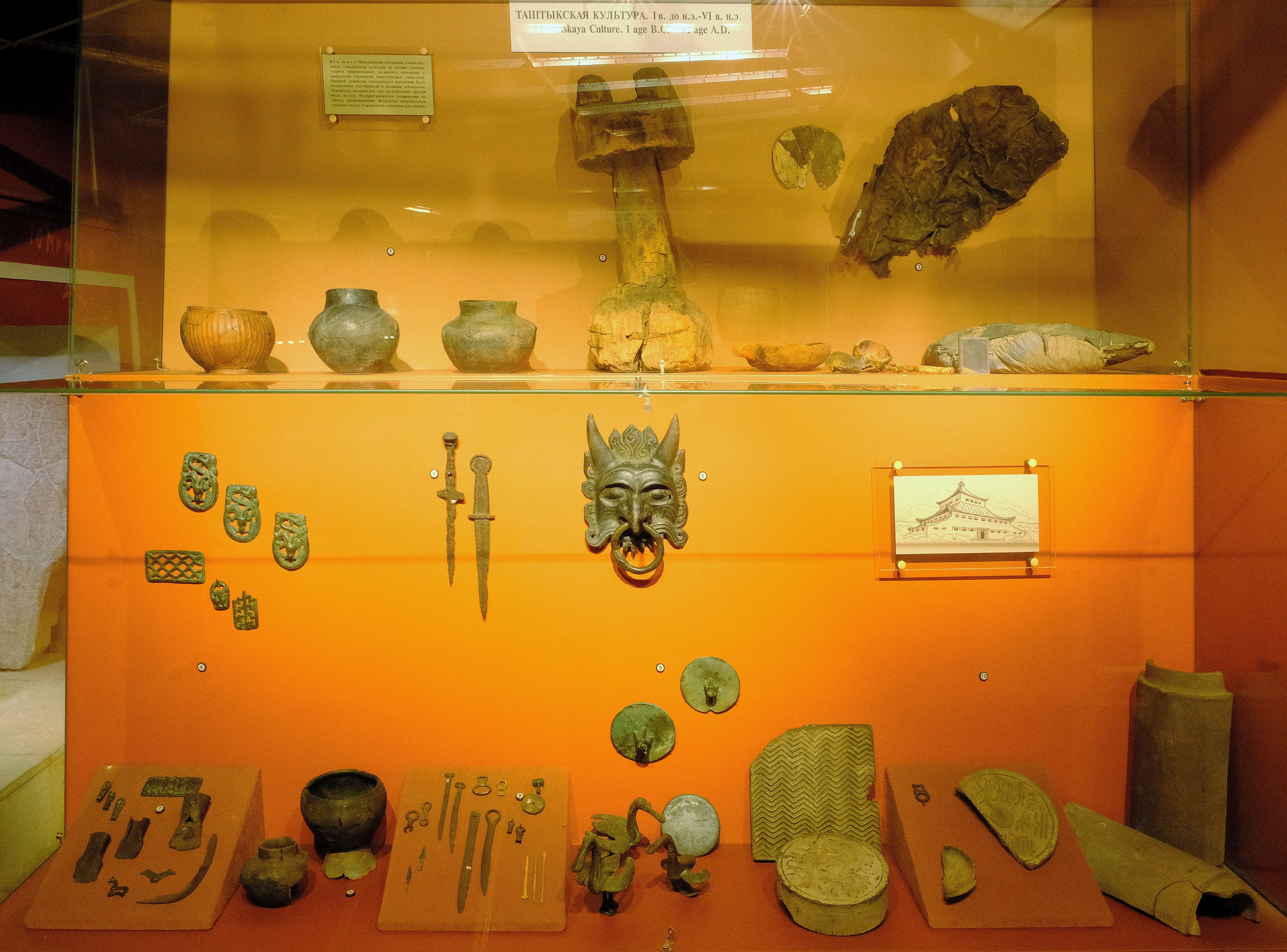
Tashtyk culture exhibit (1st-4th century CE). Krasnoyarskiy Regional Museum

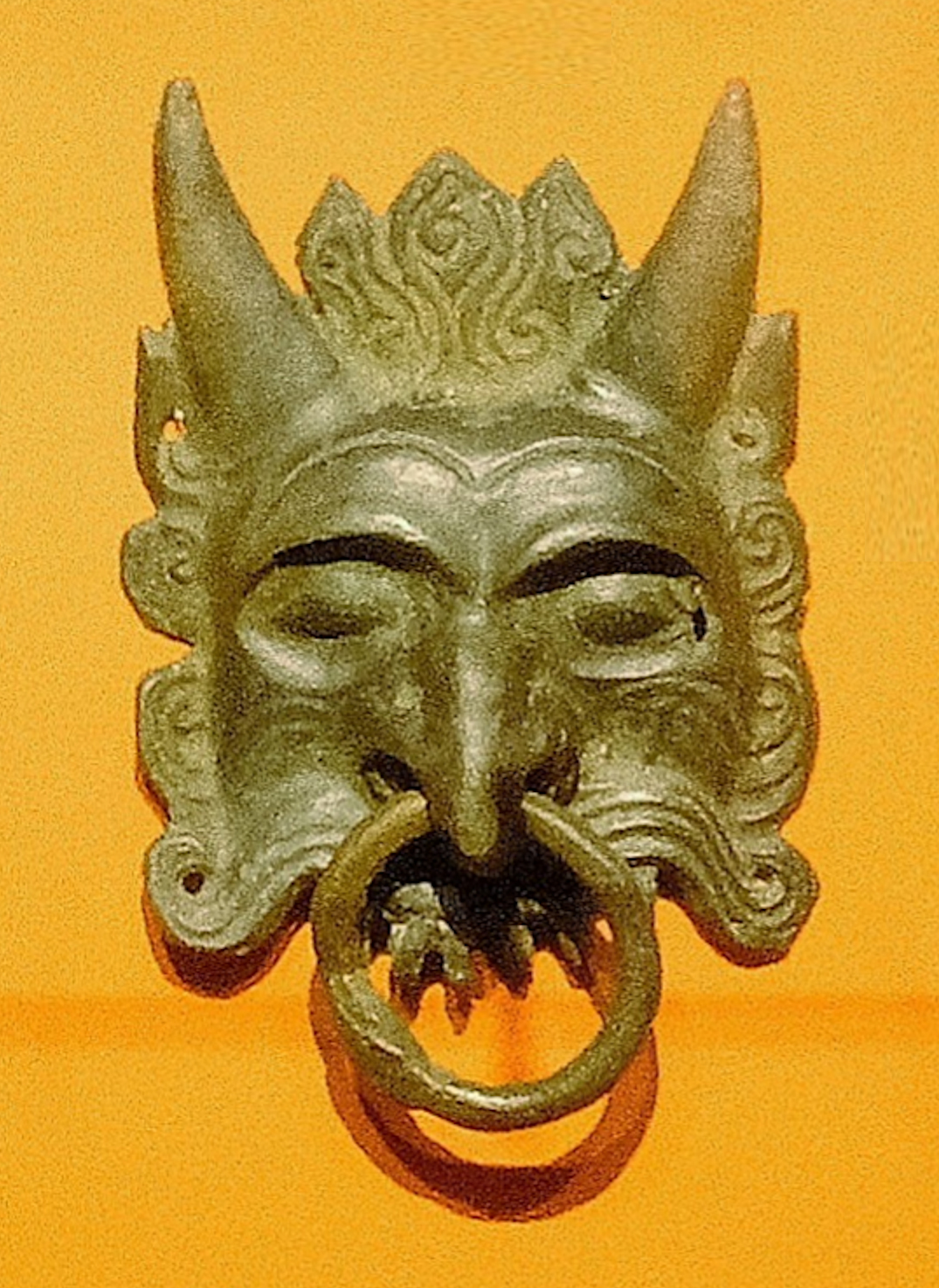
Tashtyk culture mask

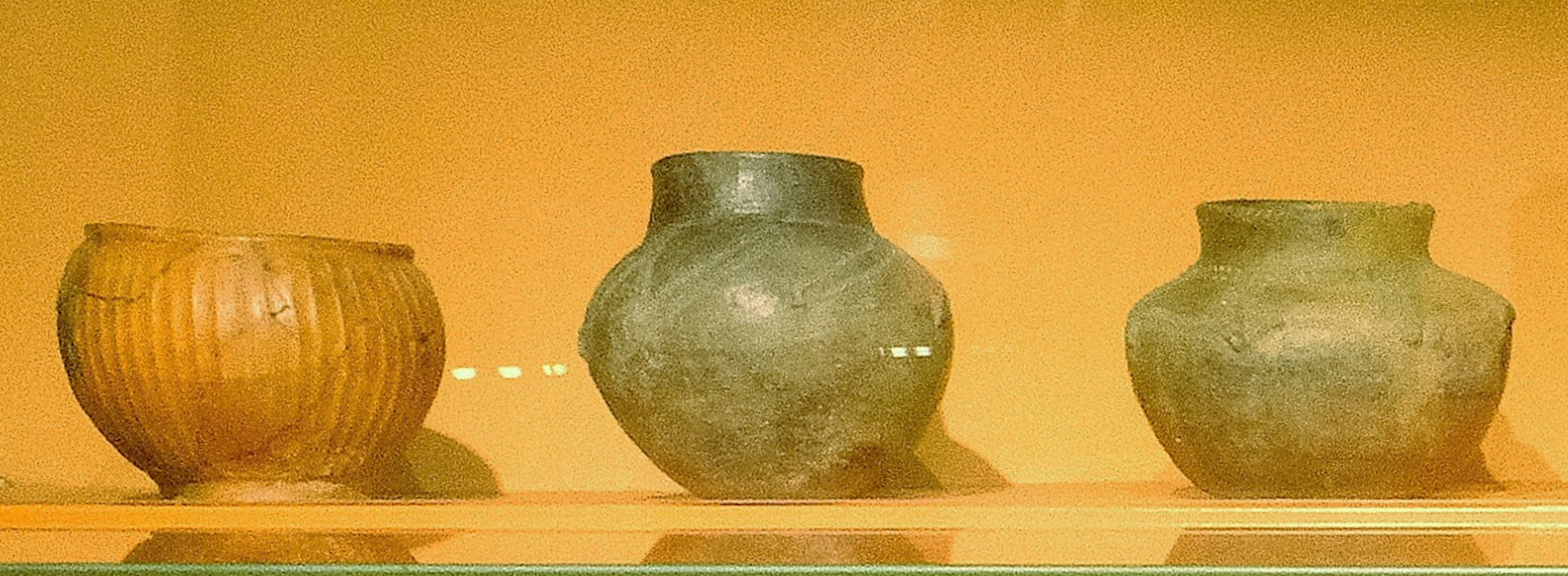
Tashtyk culture pottery

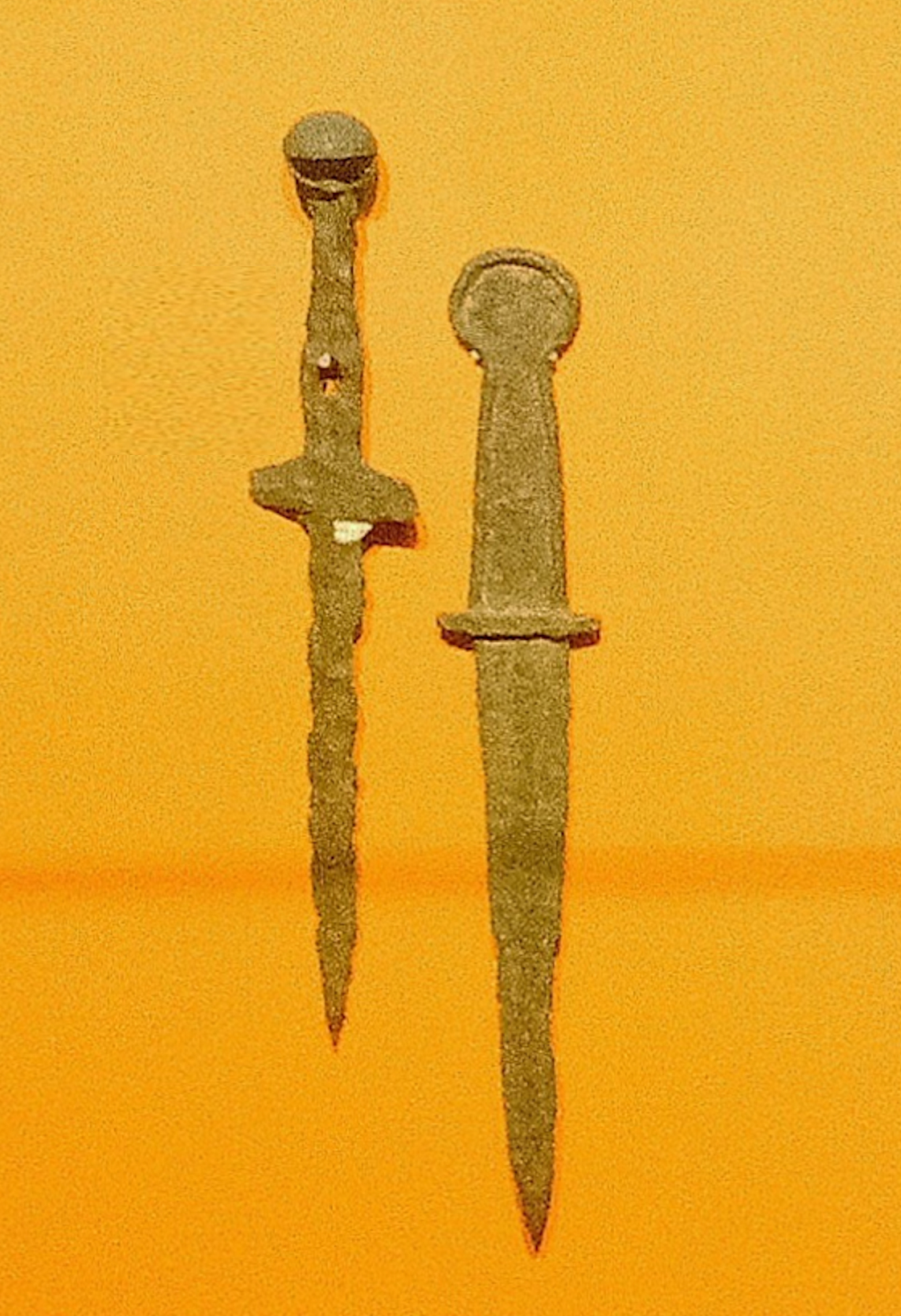
Tashtyk culture daggers

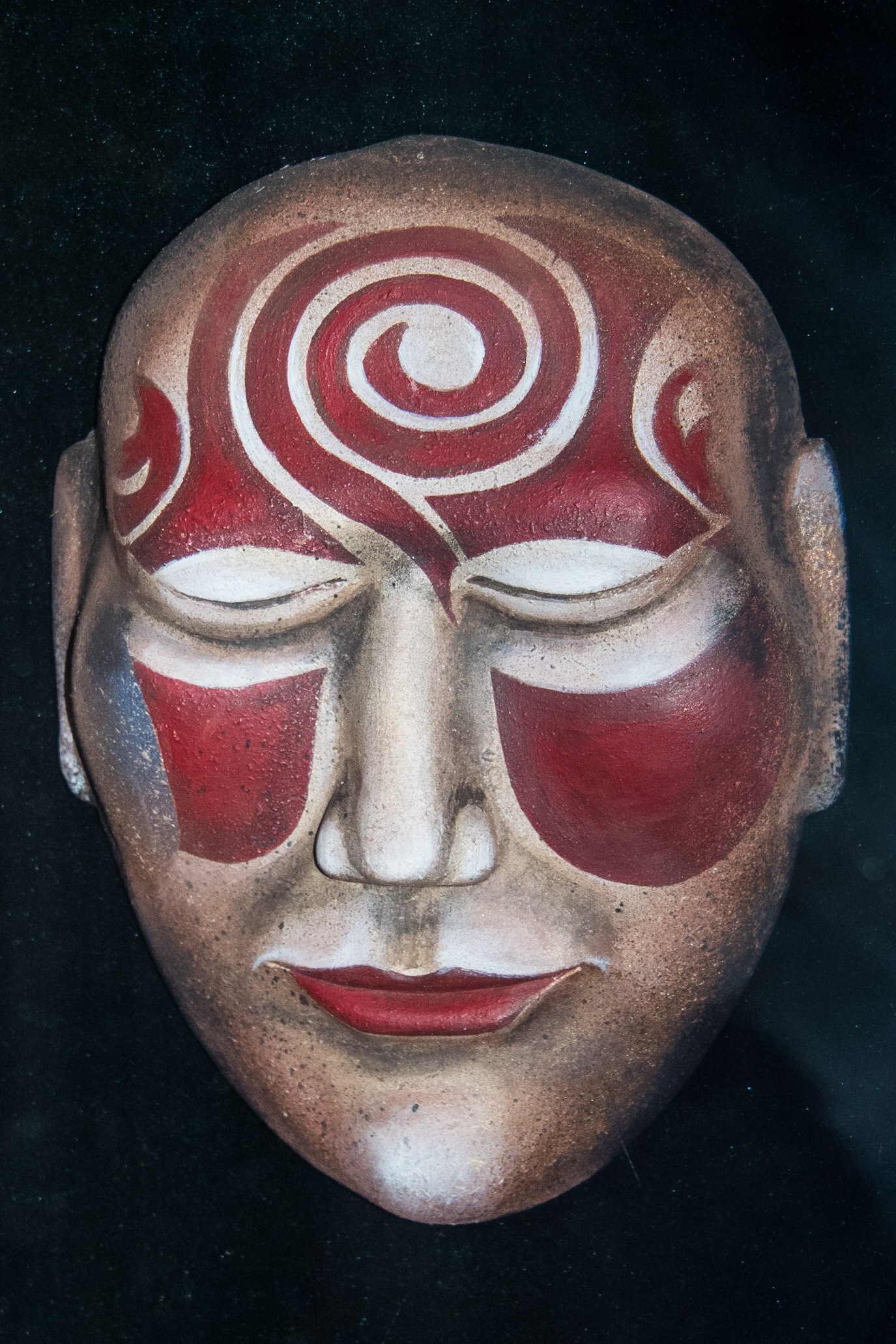
Tashtyk culture mask reconstruction

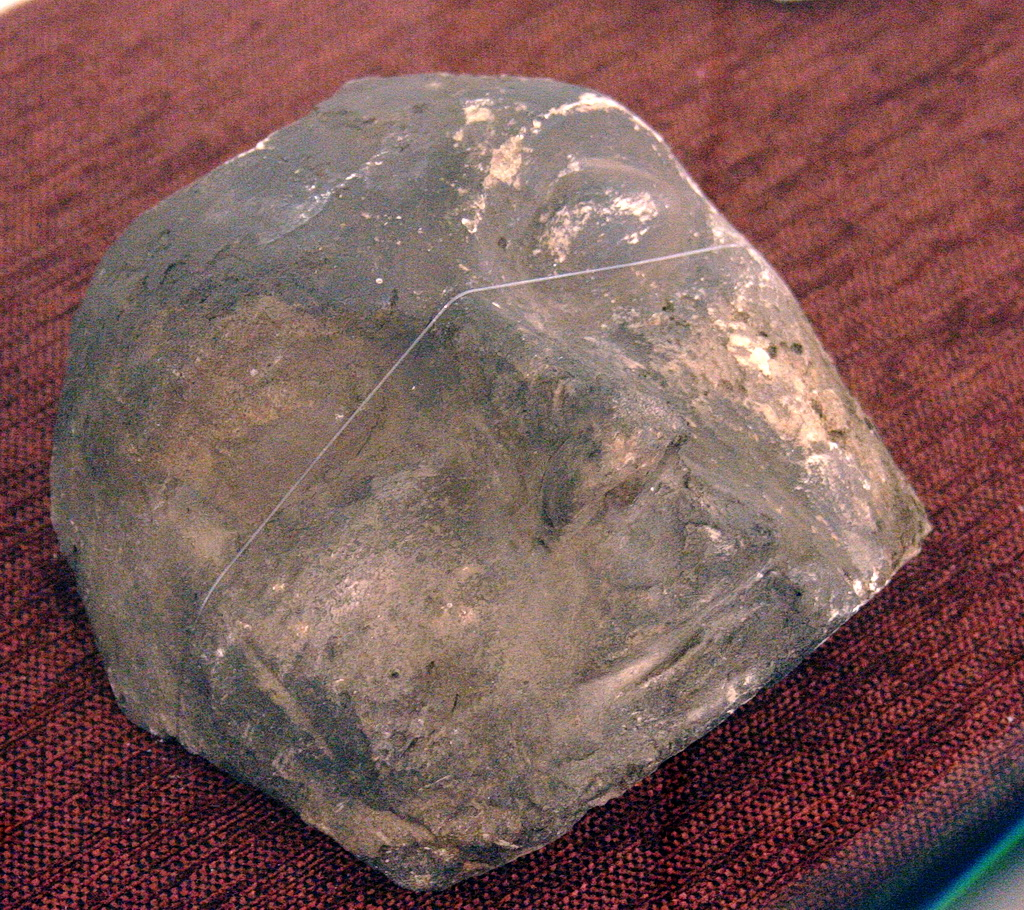
Tashtyk culture mask, Khakassia National Museum.

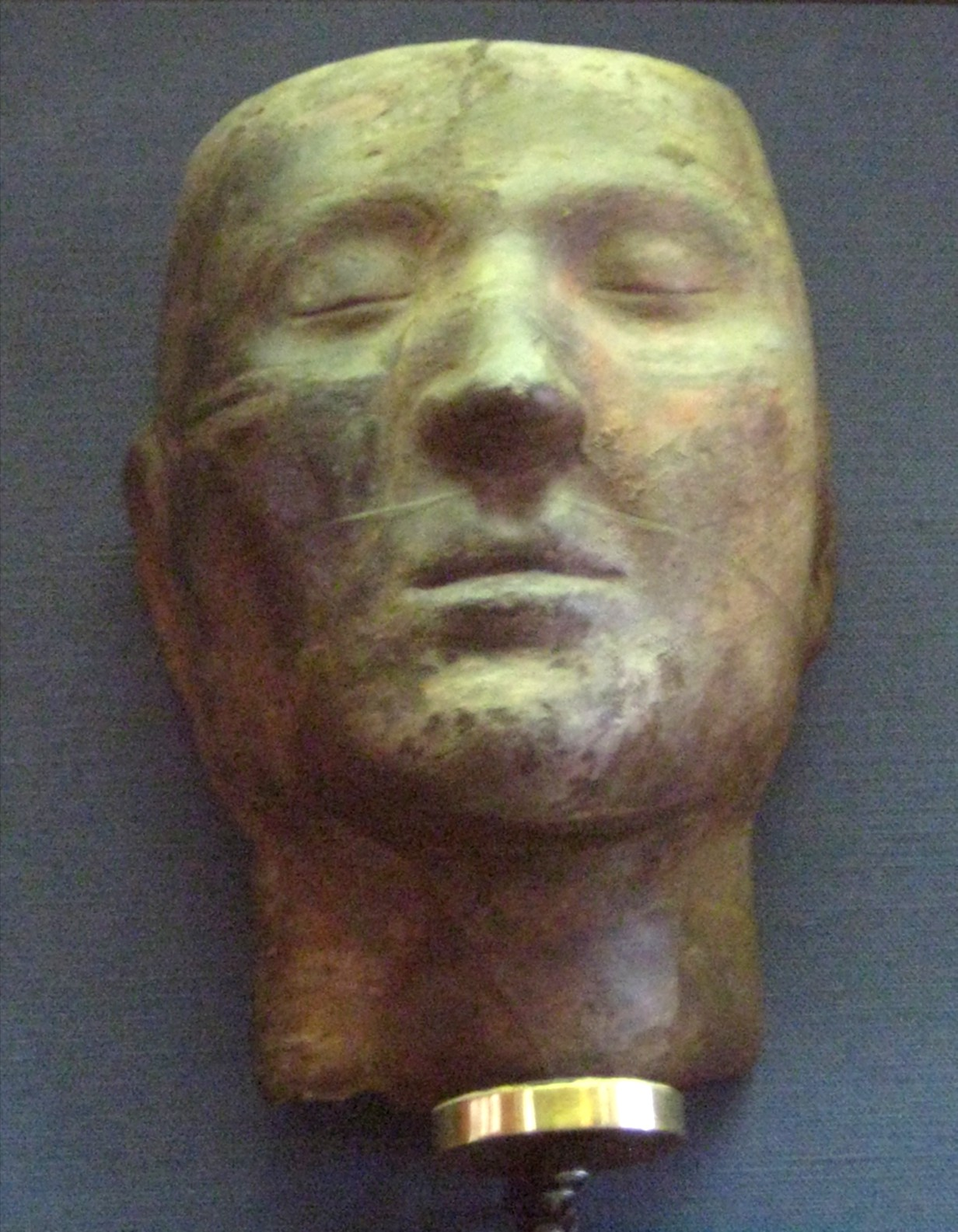
A funerary mask from Tashtyk in Moscow State Historical Museum.

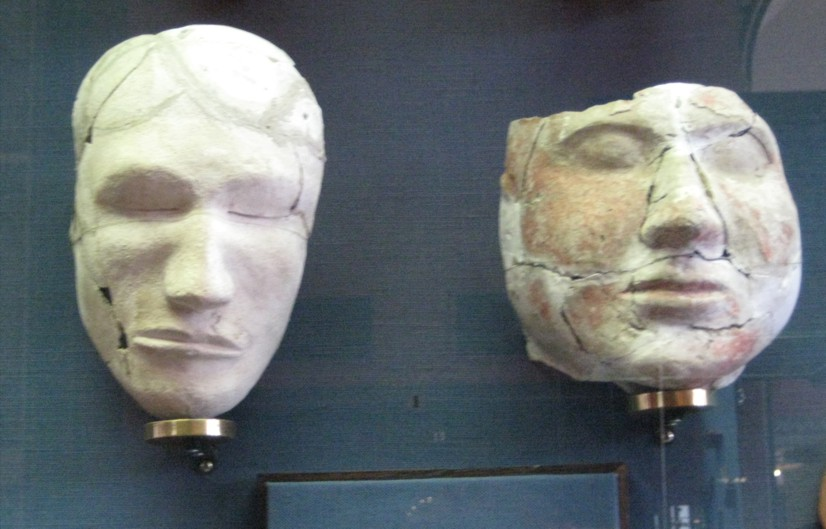
More masks in Moscow

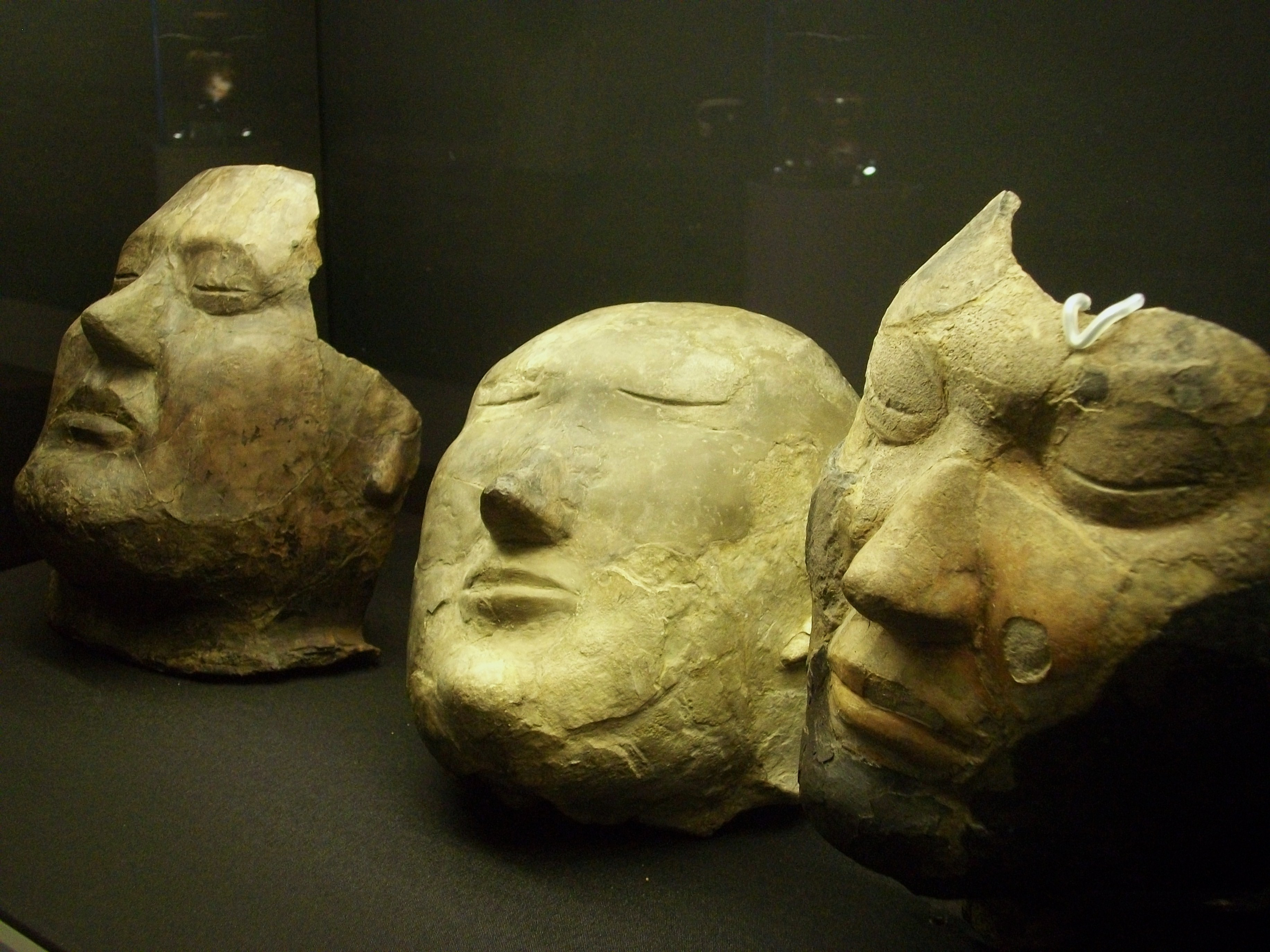
Later masks, dated to the 5th-6th century.

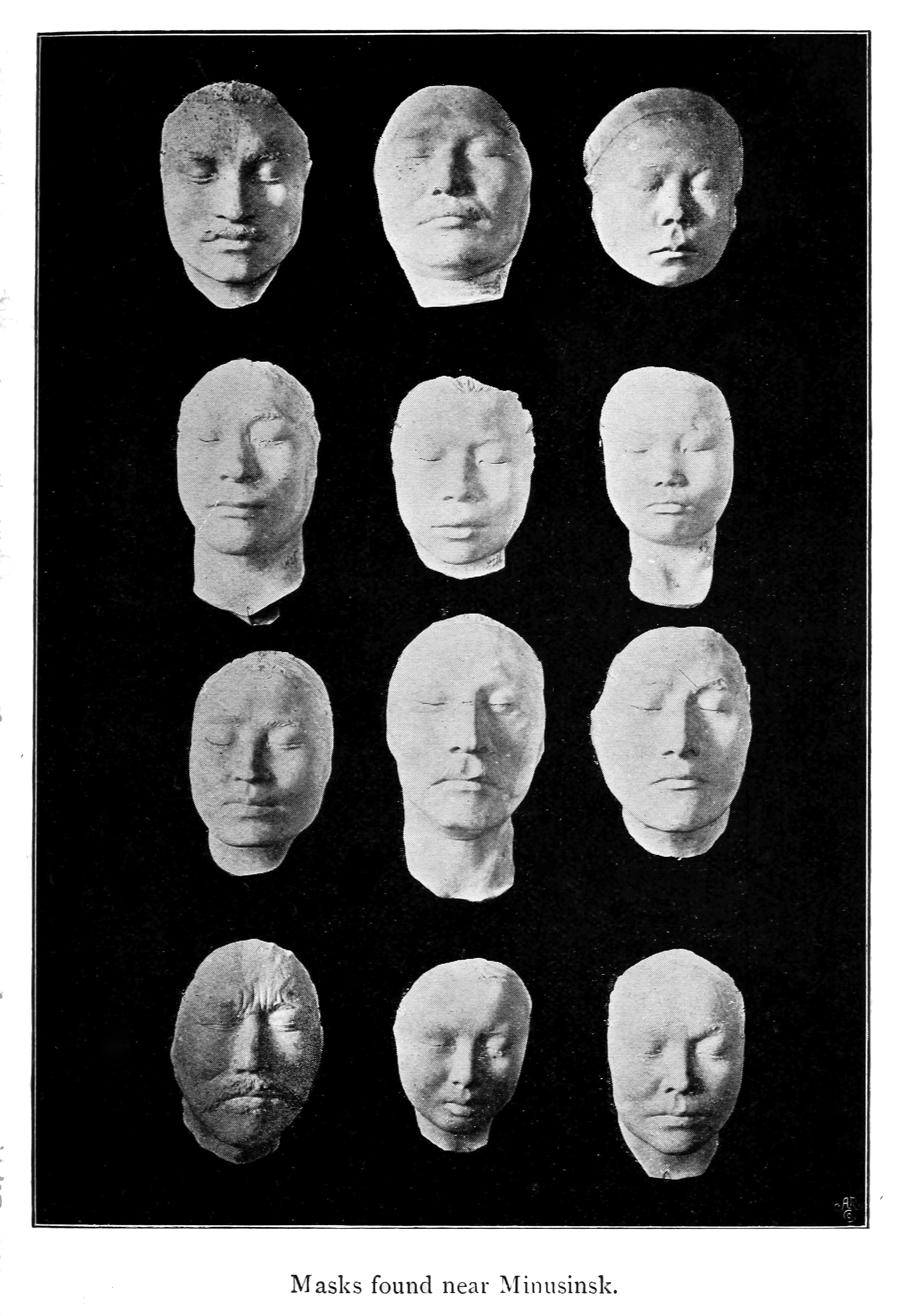
Funerary masks excavated near Minusinsk, photographed in 1901.
