= Tagar culture =

Bronze Age culture in South Siberia

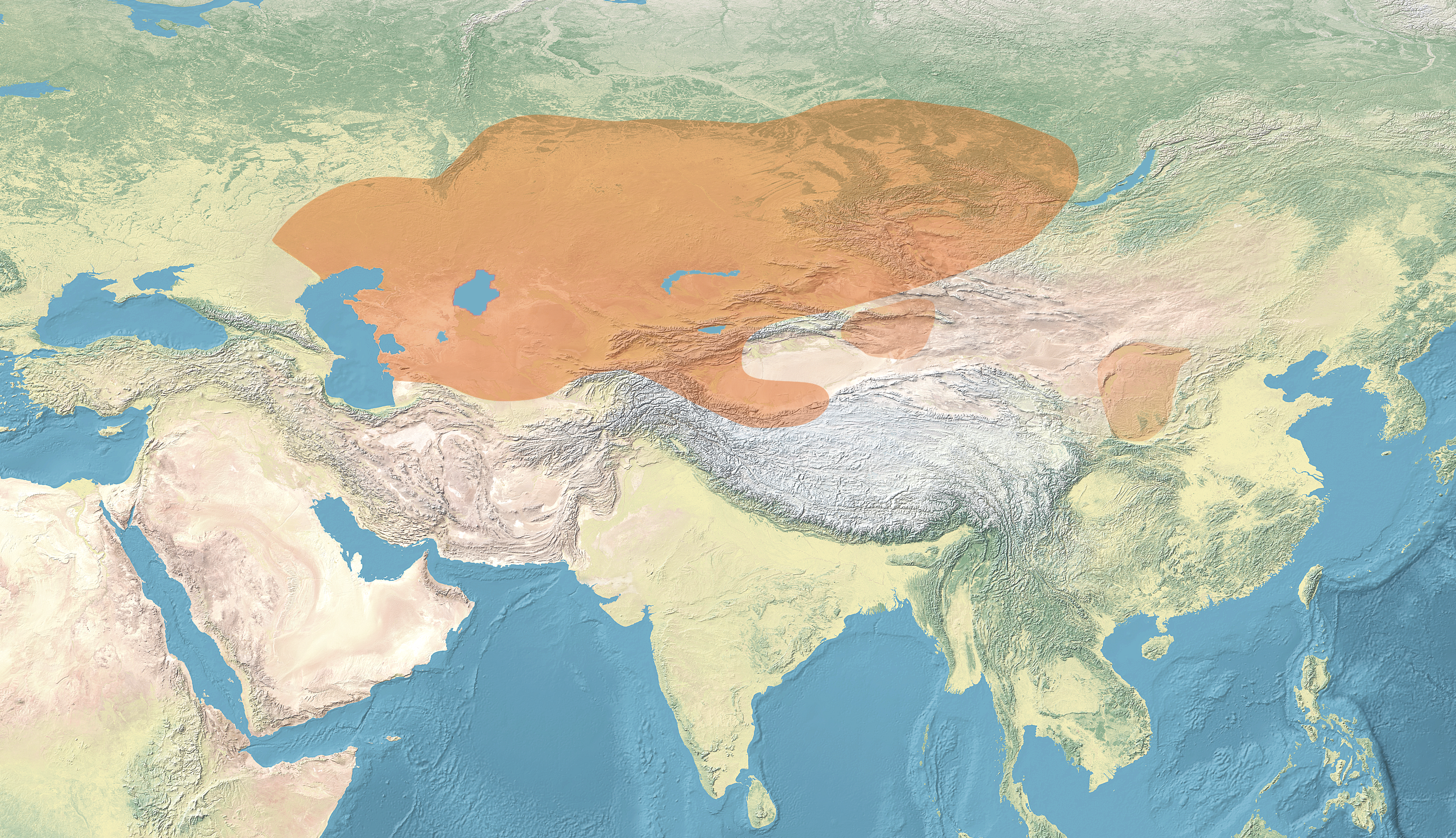
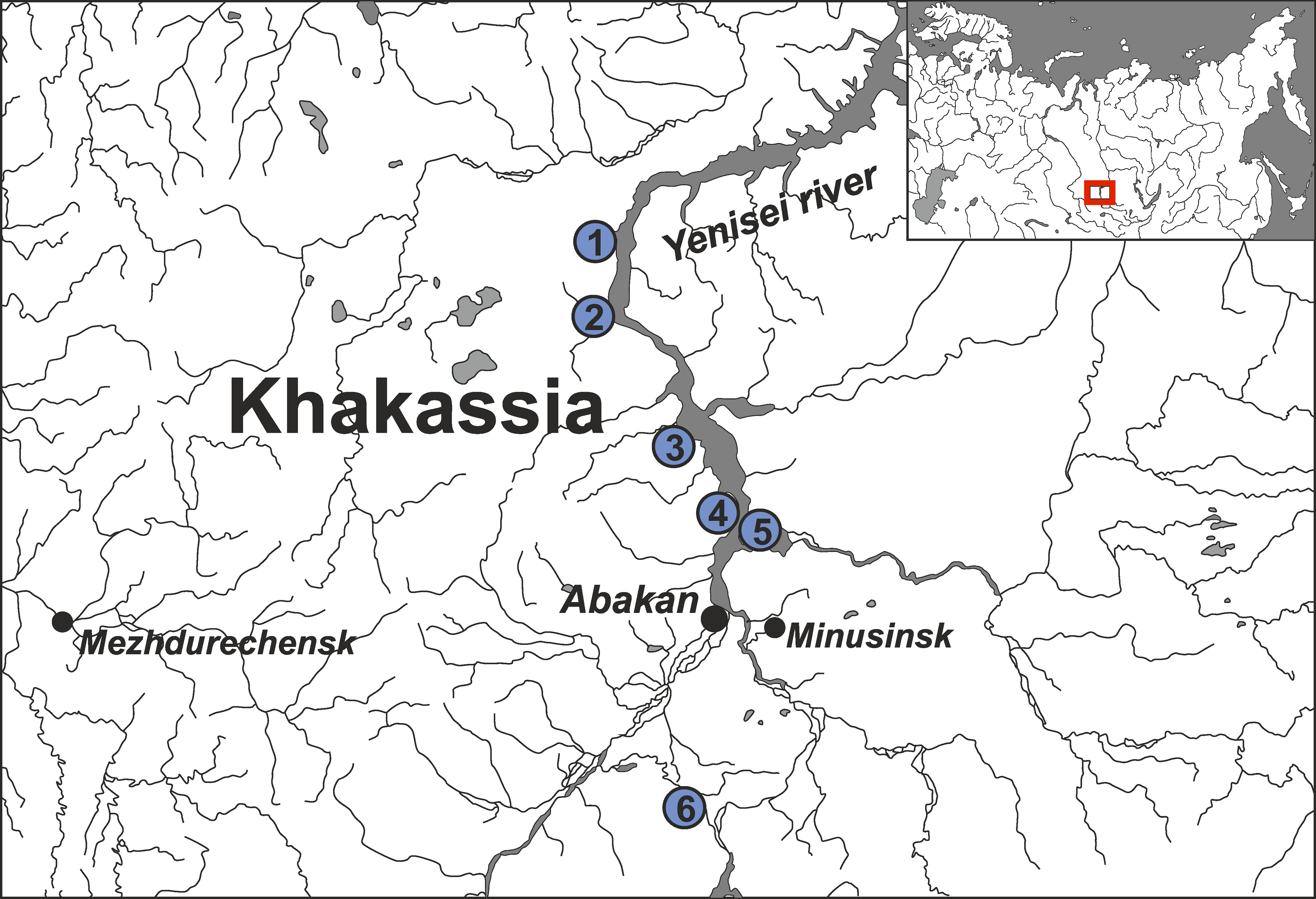
- Location of the Tagar culture (site of Tagar) within the Saka realm ( ), and contemporary Asian polities c. -325 Some Tagar archaeological sites.
- Geographical range: South Central Siberia
- Period: Bronze Age
- Dates: ca. 800–168 BC
- Preceded by: Pazyryk culture, Arzhan culture, Karasuk culture
- Followed by: Tesinsky culture, Tashtyk culture

The Tagar culture (Note: /təˈɡɑːr/; Russian: Тага́рская культу́ра, romanized: Tagárskaya kultúra) was a Bronze Age Saka archaeological culture which flourished between the 8th and 1st centuries BC in South Siberia (Republic of Khakassia, southern part of Krasnoyarsk Territory, eastern part of Kemerovo Province). The culture was named after an island in the Yenisei River opposite Minusinsk. The civilization was one of the largest centres of bronze-smelting in ancient Eurasia.

== History ==
The Tagar culture was preceded by the Karasuk culture. They are usually considered as descendants of the Andronovo culture, and are frequently linked to Indo-Iranians. However, the Turkic Dinlin tribe was also a part of the Tagar culture. The Tagar people possessed a mixture of West and East Eurasian ancestry, with East Asian ancestry increasing in to the Iron Age.

From the 2nd century BCE, the Tagar period was succeeded by a period Hunnic influence linked to the rise of the Xiongnu. The "Tesinsky culture" was a culture of the Minusinsk basin, from the 1st century BCE to the 1st century CE. The Tesinsky culture was at the junction between the Tagar culture and the culture of the Xiongnu and the Xianbei, and artistic evolutions can be traced to that period.

The Tashtyk culture (1st-4th century CE) then followed.

== Research ==
The Minusinsk basin was first excavated by Daniel Gottlieb Messerschmidt in 1722. Messerschmidt and Philip Johan von Strahlenberg were the first to point out similarities between the Tagar and Scythian cultures further west. The first archaeological descriptions of the Tagar were made by Sergei Teploukhov. His periodization have formed the basis for later research.

== Characteristics ==
The Tagar lived in timber dwellings heated by clay ovens and large hearths. Some settlements were surrounded by fortifications. They made a living by raising livestock, predominantly large horned livestock and horses, goats and sheep. There are evidence of farming with irrigation.

The Tagar produced animal art motifs (Scythian art) very similar to the Scythians of southern European Russia.

Perhaps the most striking feature of the culture are huge royal kurgans fenced by stone plaques, with four vertical stelae marking the corners. Burials from the early Tagar period are characterized as single burials. In the later Tagar period, collective burials become more common. This has been interpreted as a sign of social evolution in Tagar society.

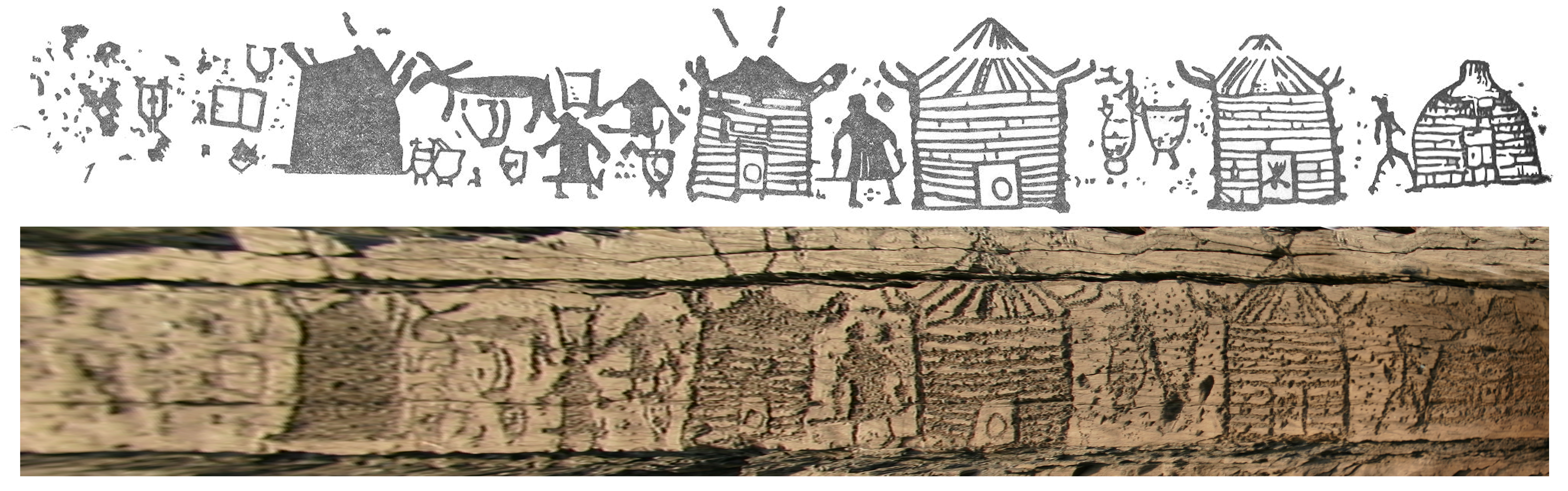
Petroglyphs from the Tagar Culture.

== Physical characteristics ==
The Tagar people have been the subject of numerous studies by physical anthropologists. The Tagars have been described by researchers as having Europoid features.

=== Genetics ===
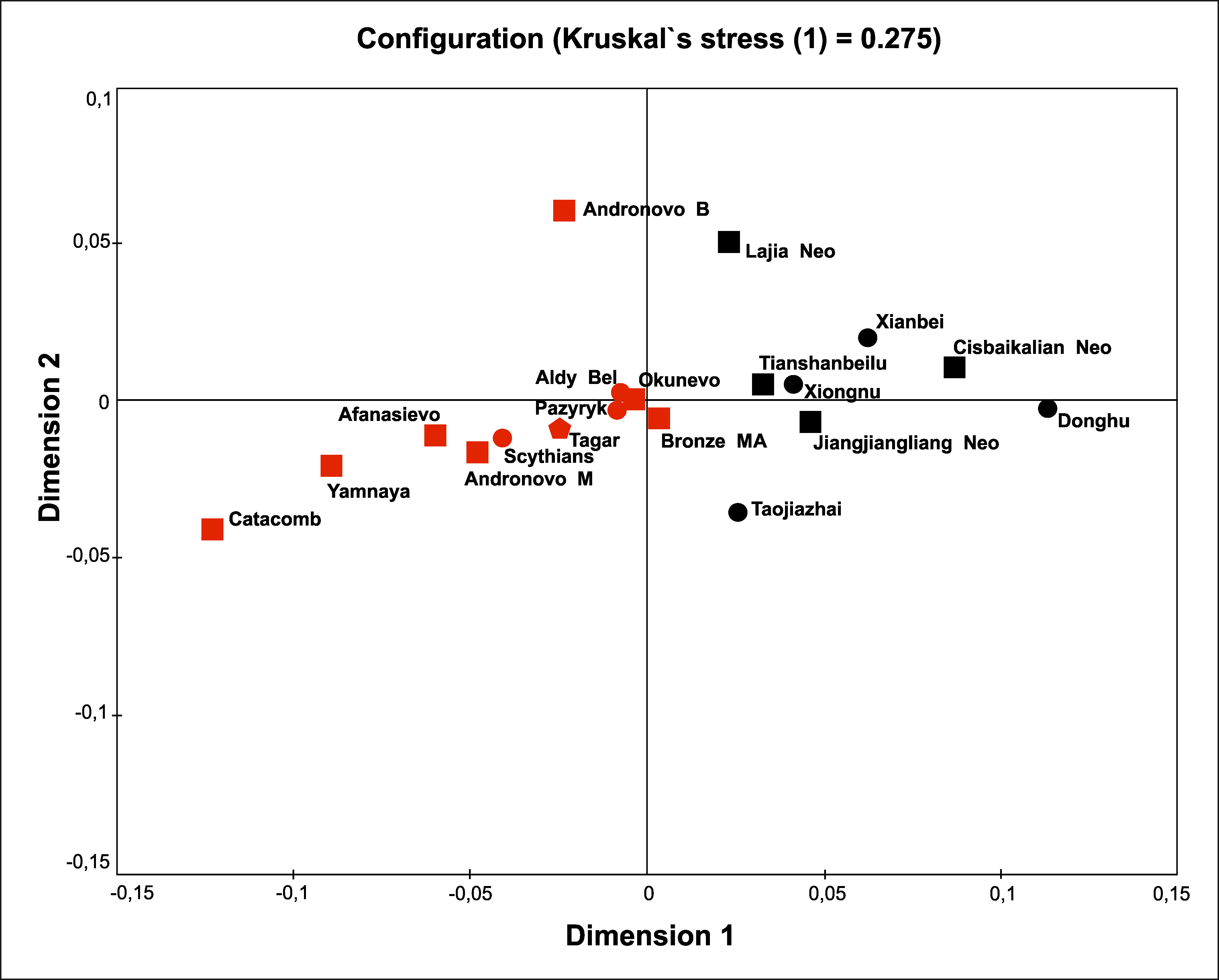
Multidimensional scaling of the Tagar and other ancient populations from Eurasia, based on mtDNA sequences.

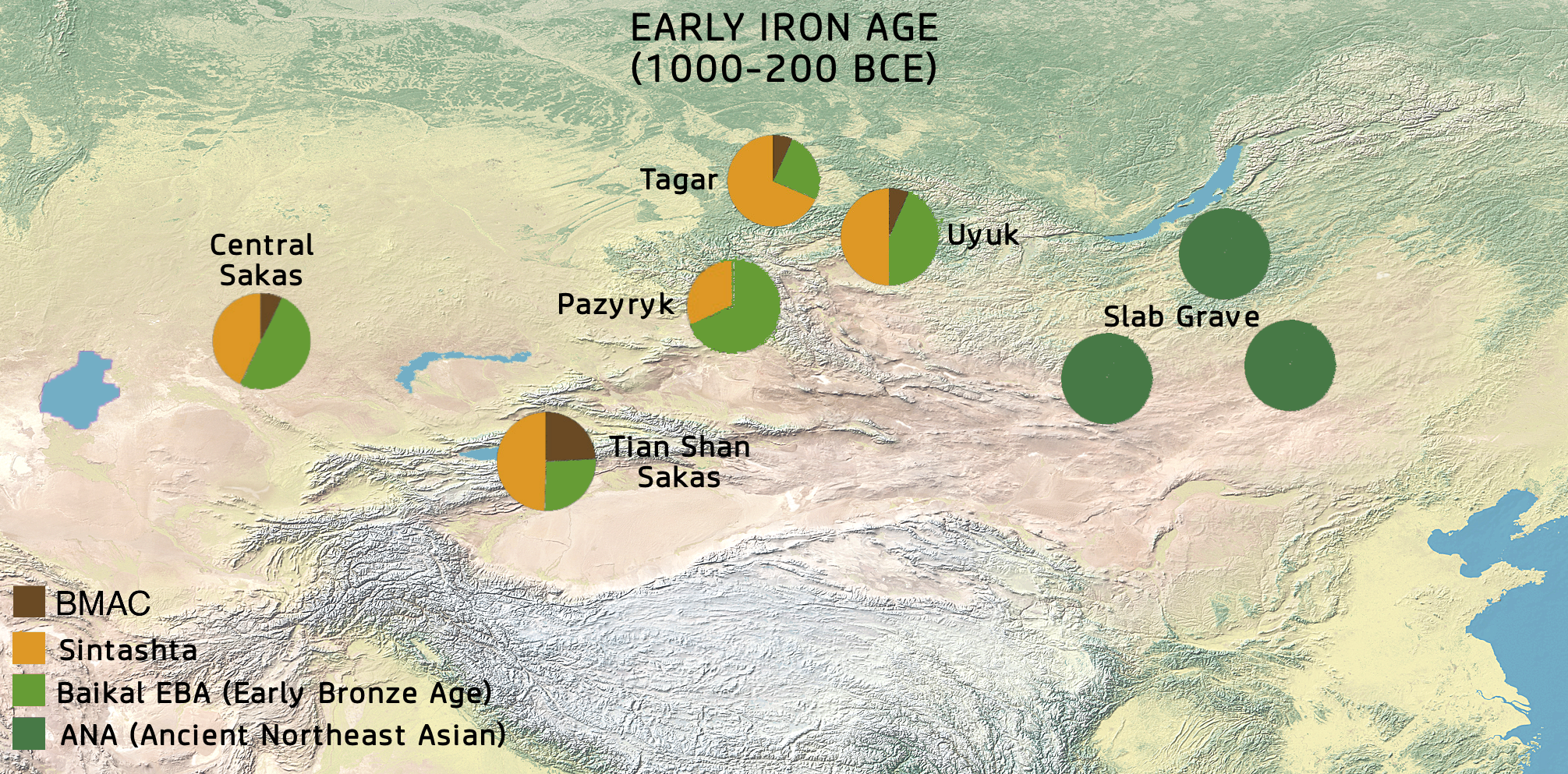
Early Iron Age Southern Siberian genetic ancestries. The Slab-grave people are uniformly of Ancient Northeast Asian (ANA, ) origin, while Saka populations to the west combined Western Eurasian (Sintashta) and Ancient Northeast Asian (Baikal_EBA) ancestry, with a smaller BMAC admixture.

In 2009, a genetic study of ancient Siberian cultures, the Andronovo culture, the Karasuk culture, the Tagar culture and the Tashtyk culture, was published in Human Genetics. Twelve individuals of the Tagar culture from 800 BC to 100 AD were surveyed. Extractions of mtDNA from ten individuals were determined to represent three samples of haplogroup T3, one sample of I4, one sample G2a, one sample of C, one sample of F1b and three samples of H (including one sample of H5). Extractions of Y-DNA from six individuals were all determined to be of Y-chromosome haplogroup R1a1, which is thought to mark the eastward migration of the early Indo-Europeans. Based on an analysis of 10 SNPs, the majority of Tagar individuals were classified as being primarily of European ancestry, with the exception of one mixed ancestry individual. Of the specimens yielding a pigmentation phenotype, slightly more than half (5) were assigned blue eye color, while 4 were possibly blue or brown eyed. Most were assigned blond or light brown hair color.

In 2018, a study of mtDNA from remains of the Tagar culture was published in PLOS One. Remains from the early years of the Tagar culture were found to be closely related to those of contemporary Scythians on the Pontic steppe. The authors of the study suggested that the source of this genetic similarity was a substantial increase in the frequency of East Asian maternal haplogroups in the Tagar population, which occurred during the Iron Age. Nearly 46% of Tagar samples carried an East Asian maternal haplogroup in the Iron Age, with lineages D and C more than tripling in frequency compared to the Early Tagar period.

A genetic study published in Nature in May 2018 examined the remains of eight individuals ascribed to the Tagar culture. The three samples of Y-DNA collected all belonged to haplogroup R1. The samples of mtDNA collected were N1a1a1a1, N9a9, H5a1, W1c, U2e2, A8a1, U2e1h and F1b1b. The Tagar had a higher amount of Eastern Hunter-Gatherer (EHG) ancestry than all other peoples of the Scythian cultures. They were determined to be of about 83,5% Western Steppe Herder (WSH) ancestry, 9% Ancient North Eurasian (ANE) ancestry, and 7,5% Siberian Hunter-Gather ancestry.

A subsequent genetic study in 2020 modeled the Tagar specimens as deriving around 70% ancestry from the Sintashta culture, 25% from Ancient Northeast Asian (ANA) Baikal hunter-gatherers, and 5% from the Bactria–Margiana Archaeological Complex.

== Gallery ==
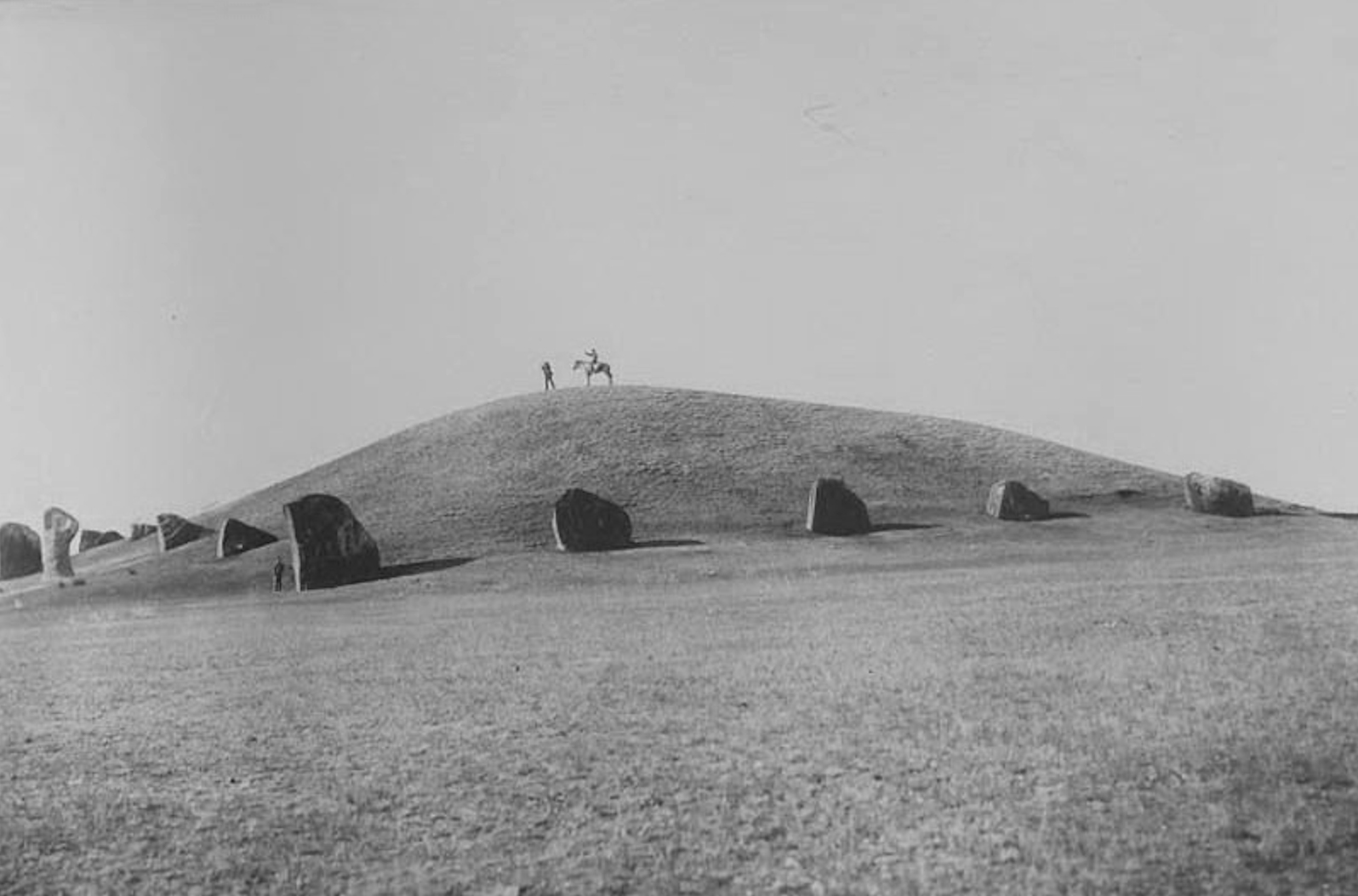
Salbyk kurgan, the largest tumulus of the Tagar culture

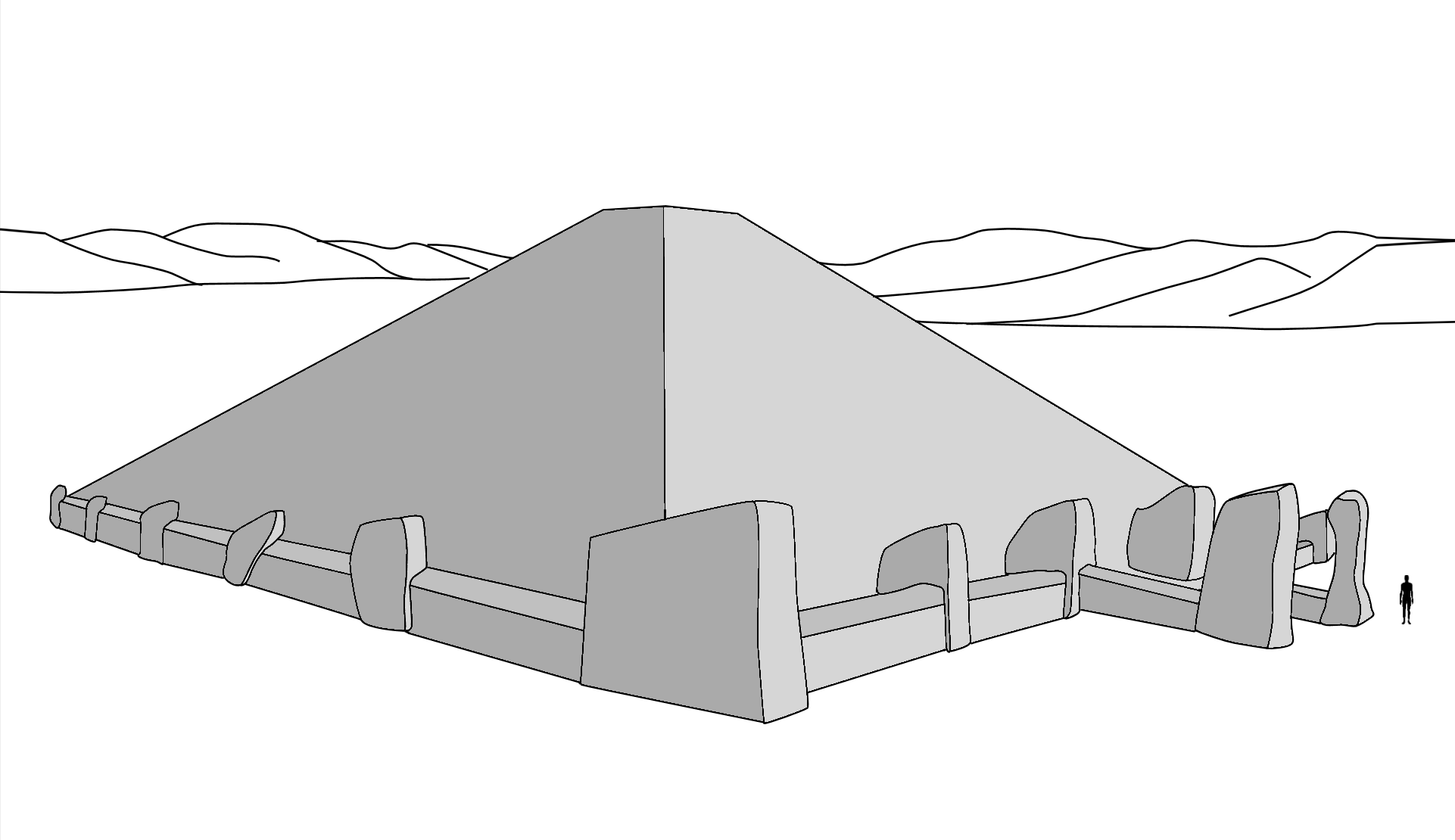
Salbyk kurgan reconstruction.

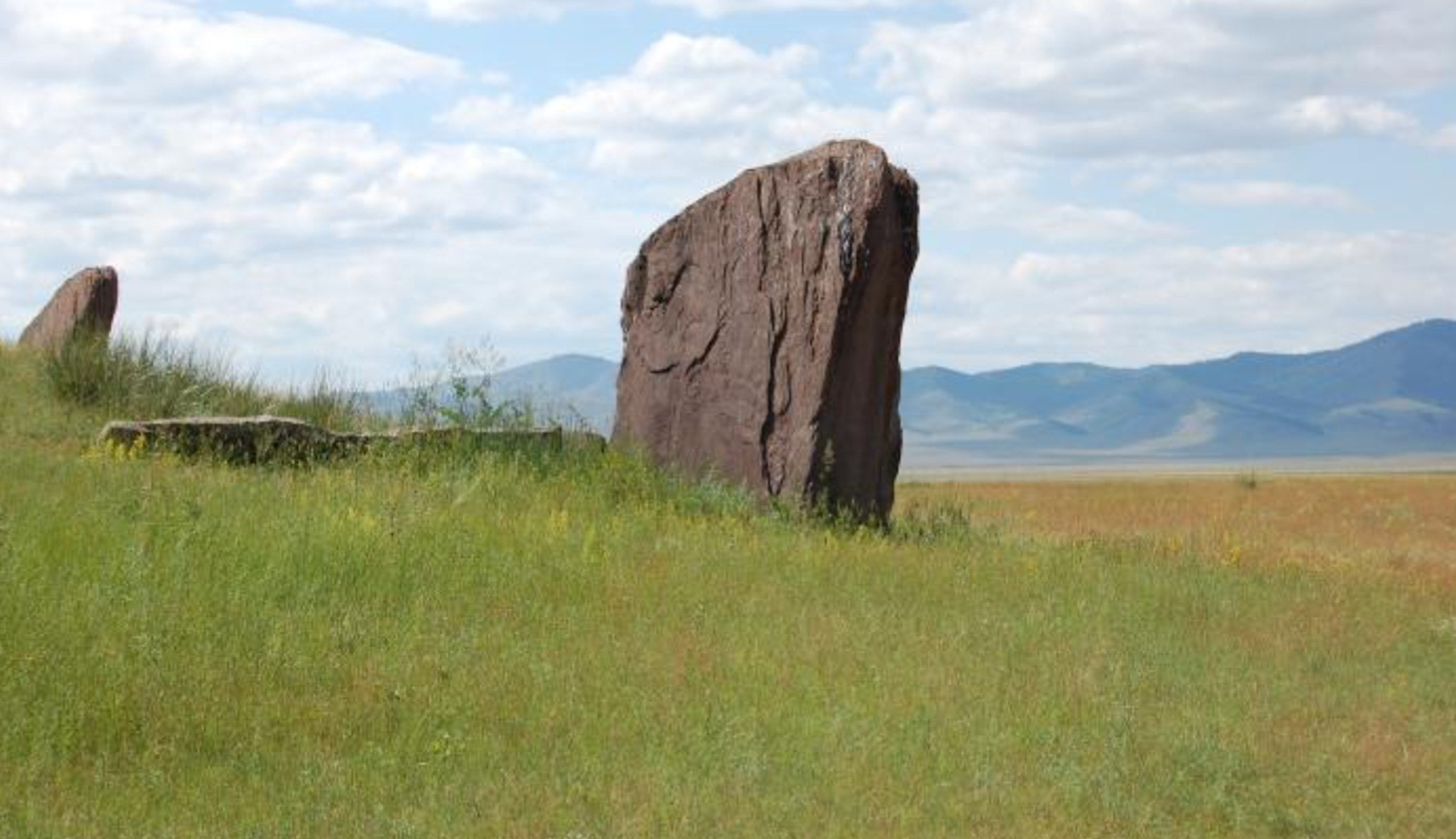
Salbyk kurgan megalith

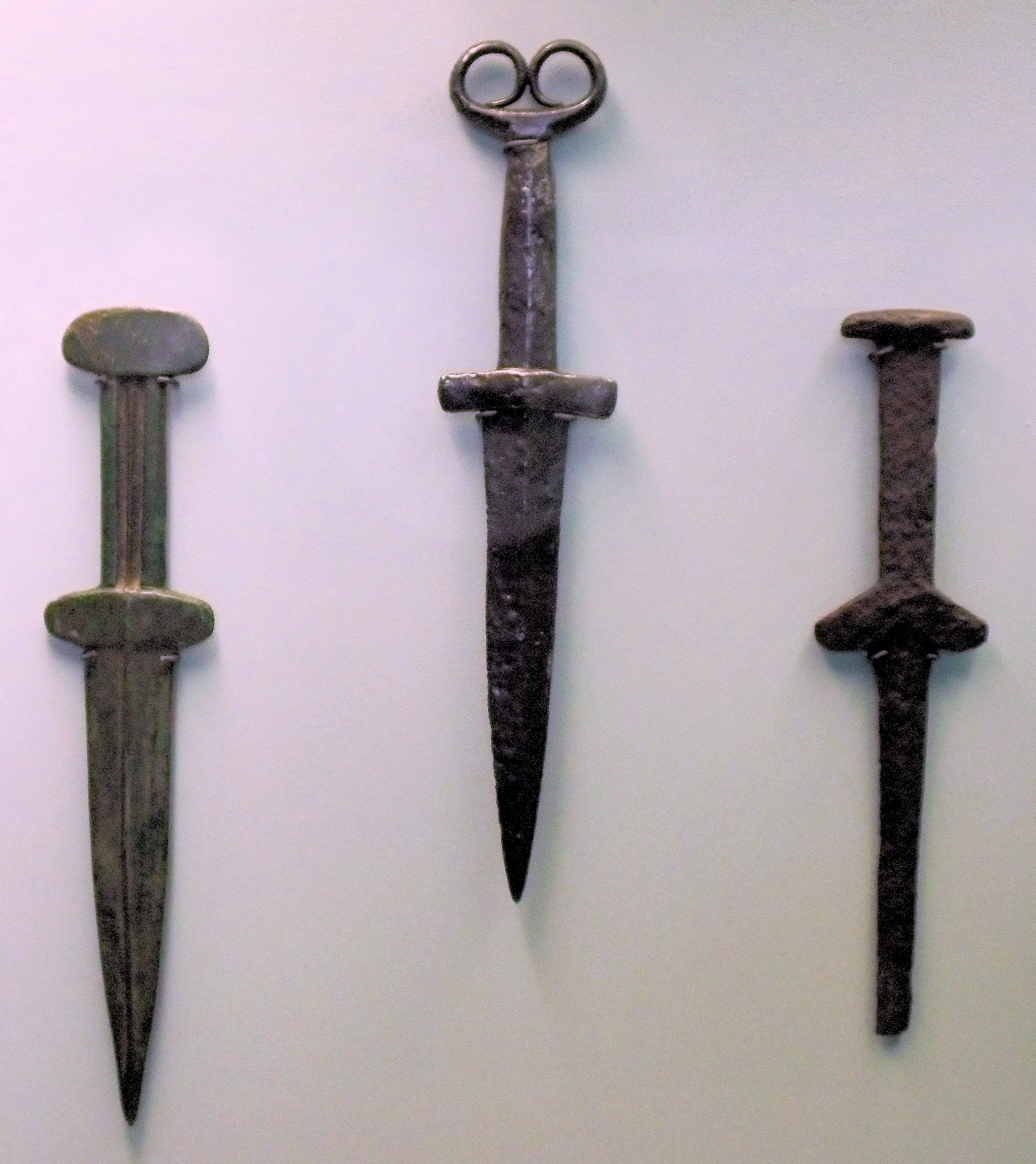
Bronze weapons of the Tagar culture, Krasnojarsk, Russia, 7th-5th century BC.

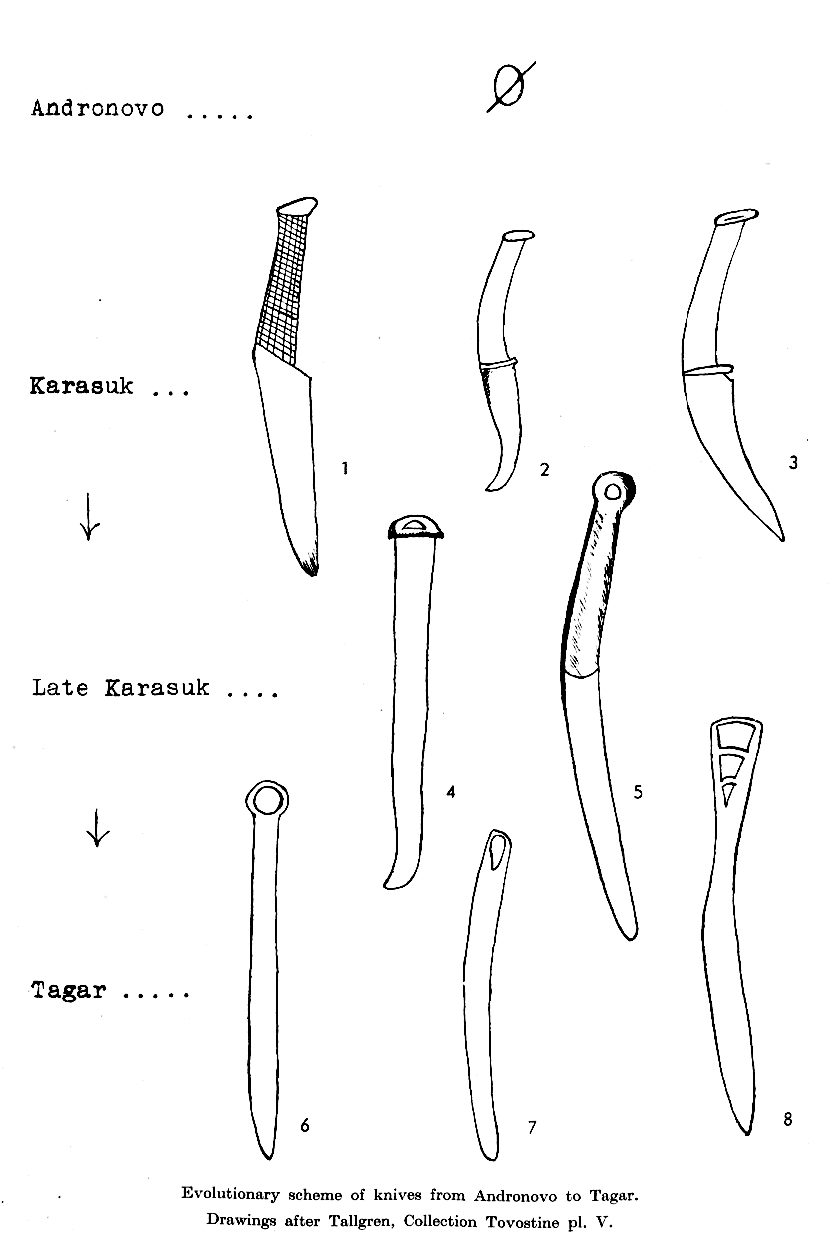
Evolution of bronze knives, from the Karasuk culture to the Tagar culture

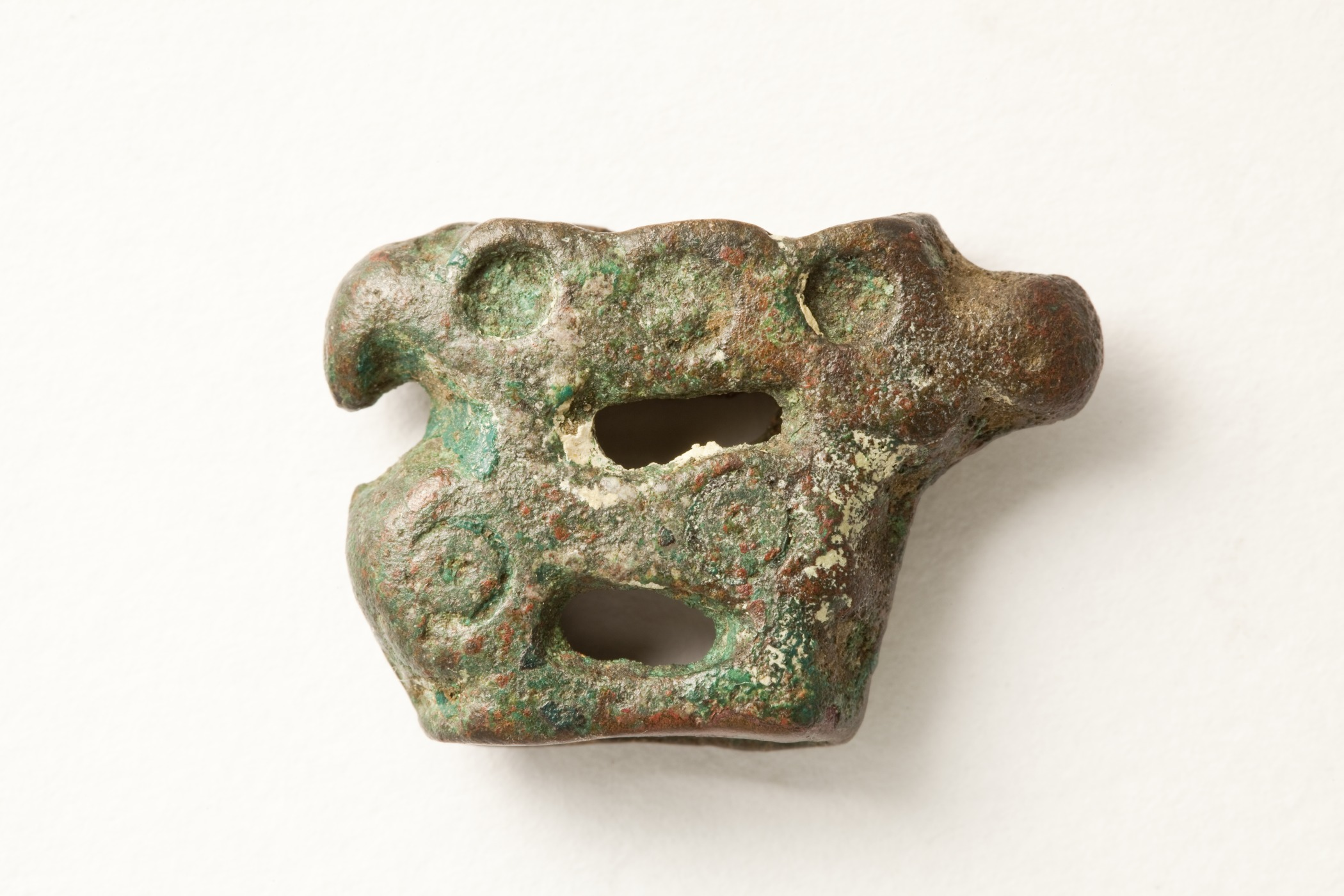
Horse accoutrement

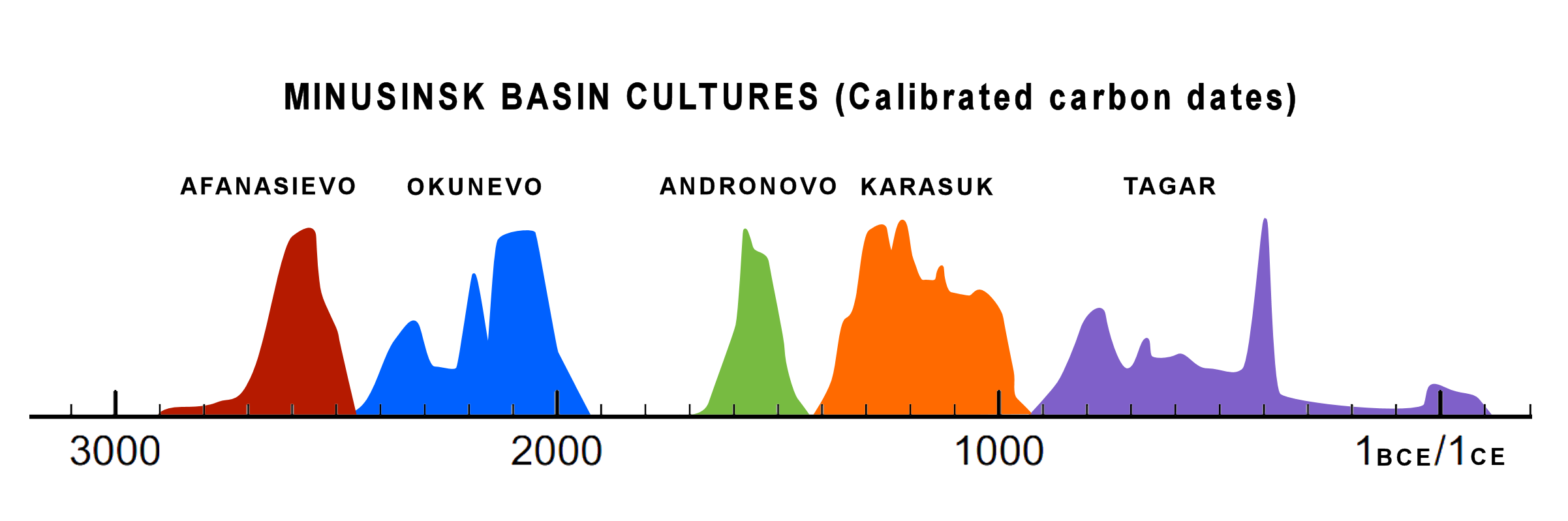
Minusinsk Basin cultures (Summed probability distribution for new human bone dates, Afanasievo to Tagar cultures).

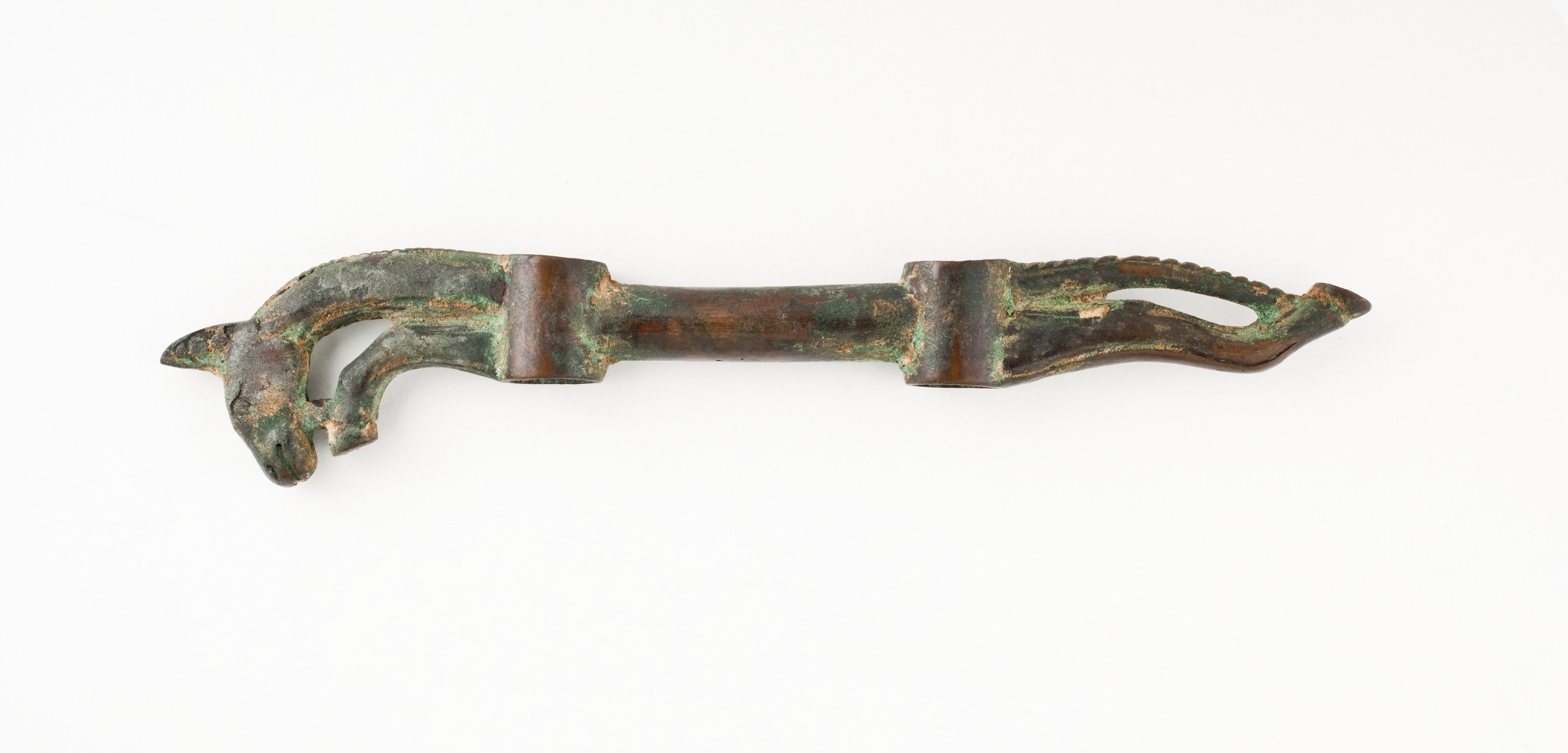
Horse trappings, Tagar culture, 6th-5th century BC.

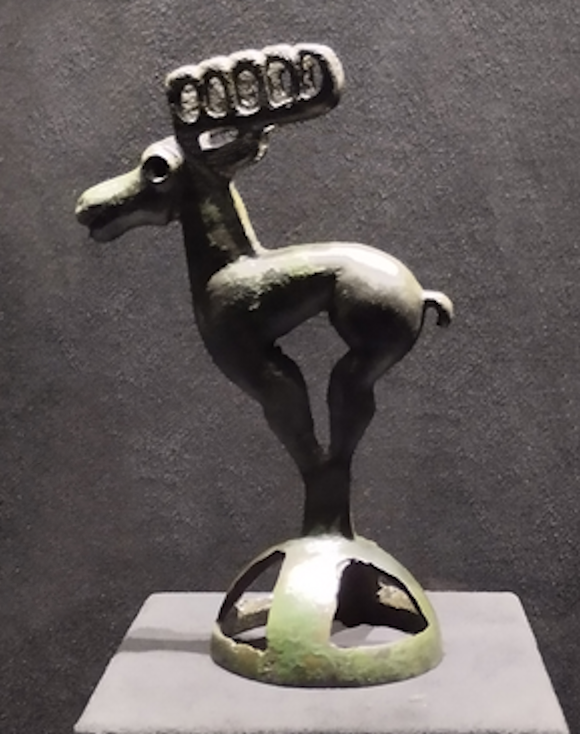
Standing deer, 7th-5th centuries BC, Tagar culture.
