= Oglakhty =

Coordinates: 53.993770°N 91.489391°E

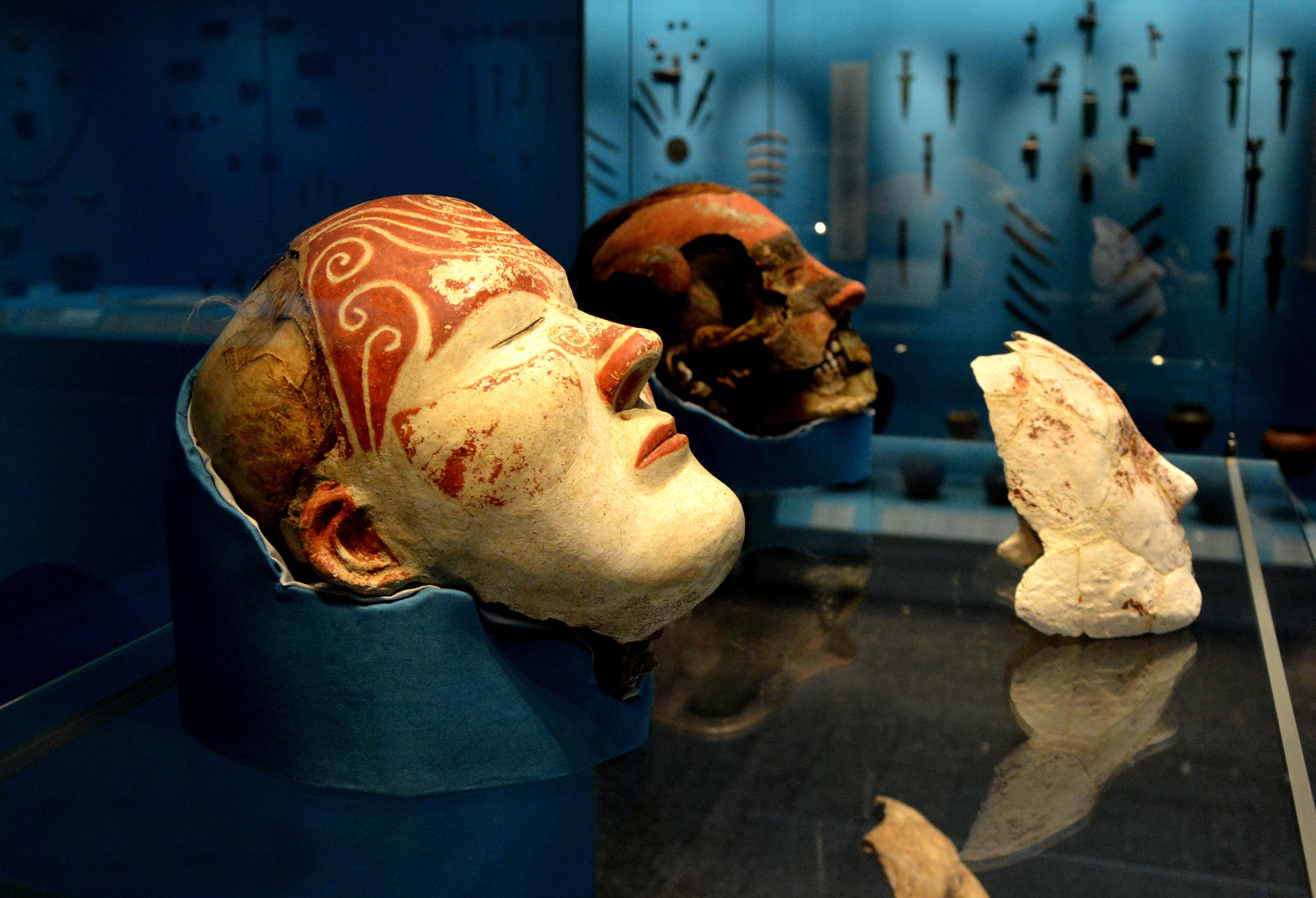
Tashtyk culture funeral masks in the Hermitage Museum

Oglahty (Russian: Оглахты, Khakas: Оғлахтығ, romanized: Oğlaxtığ) is a mountain range and a burial complex of Tashtyk culture located 60 km north of Minusinsk, Khakassia, Russia, on the right bank of Yenisei River. Oglahty burials are dated to the 1st century BC. The burials were first surveyed in 1903 by A.V. Adrianov. The dryness of the soil and favorable climatic conditions in the burial monument preserved perishable materials including wood, leather, fur, and fabrics. A prominent place among artifacts in the Oglahty complex occupy solid and decorated polychromatic fabrics. They are preserved in the Hermitage Museum of Saint Petersburg.
