= Salbyk kurgan =

Archaeological site in Russia

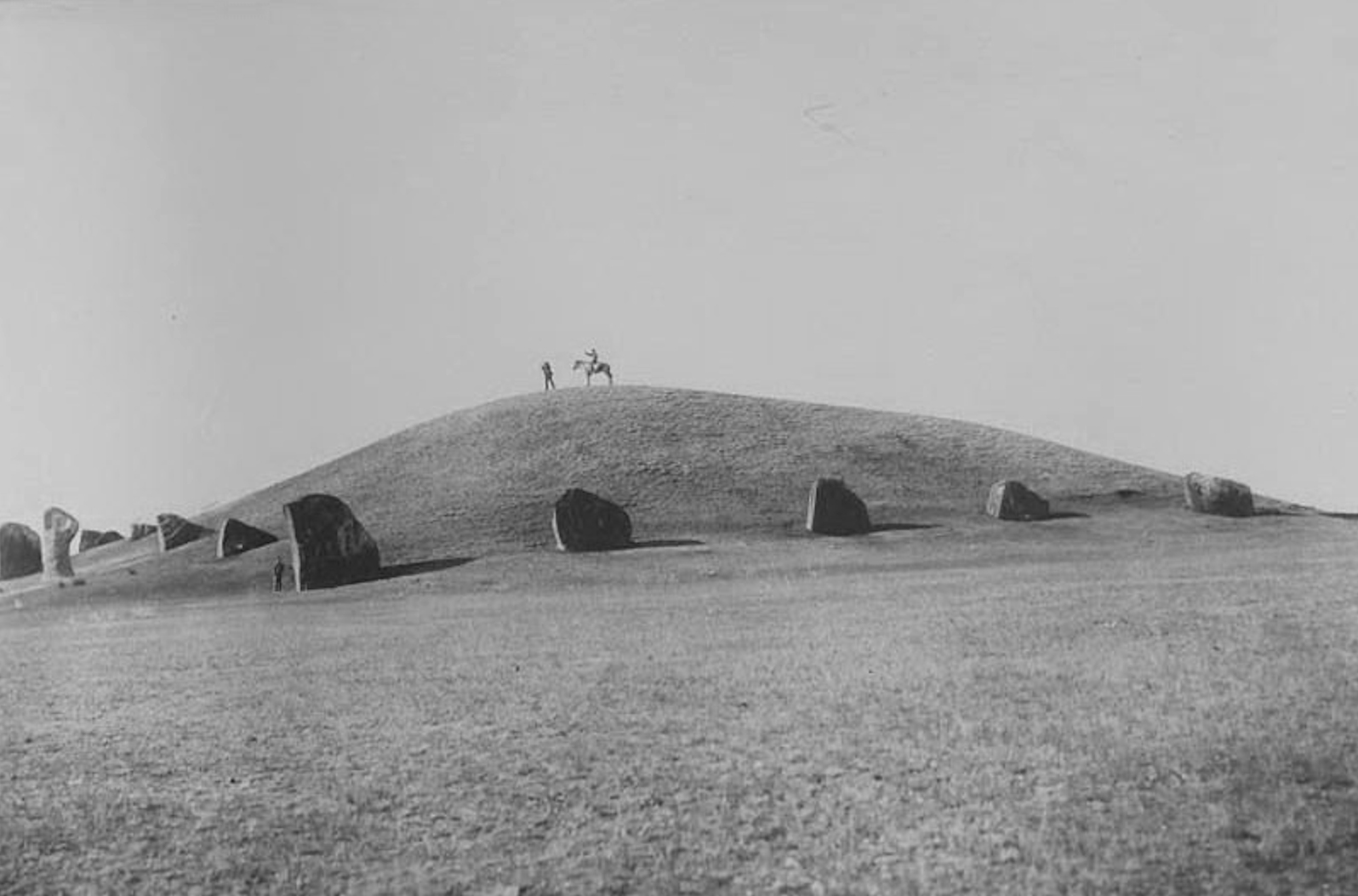
- Salbyk kurgan before excavation, early 20th century
- Size: 11m high, 500m circumference
- Created: 5th century BCE
- Discovered: 53.894259°N 90.773752°E

Location

The Salbyk kurgan (Bolshoi Salbykskii Kurgan, "Great Salbyk kurgan") is a Saka funerary tumulus (kurgan), belonging to the Tagar culture. It is located in the "Valley of the Kings" in the western part of the Minusinsk hollow, 45 kilometers northwest of Abakan, Khakassia, Russia, and is dated to 500-300 BCE. Other sources date it to the 8th to 6th centuries BCE. The tumulus was 11 meters high, and its circumference about 500 meters. It is the largest tumulus of the Tagar culture. It was a tomb of a noble Saka man, with his slaves and wives. There are about 30 other kurgan tumuli in the "Valley of the Kings", although smaller than the Great Salbyk kurgan.

The tumulus is surrounded by huge Devonian slabs, weighing 50-70 tons, which were brought over about 100 kilometers from the banks of the Yenisei River. They are arranged in a square, with horizontal slabs forming a wall enclosure. The megaliths may have had an astronomical role and seem to correspond to the position of the sunrises and sunsets at various times of the year.

The Salbyk kurgan originally had a square pyramidal structure. It was excavated in 1954-56 by removing all the earth of the kurgan, only leaving in place the monumental slabs on the periphery. It was found that it had been looted and stripped bare in Antiquity.

It is 200 km northwest of the Arzhan kurgan, and 400 km northeast of the Pazyryk kurgans.

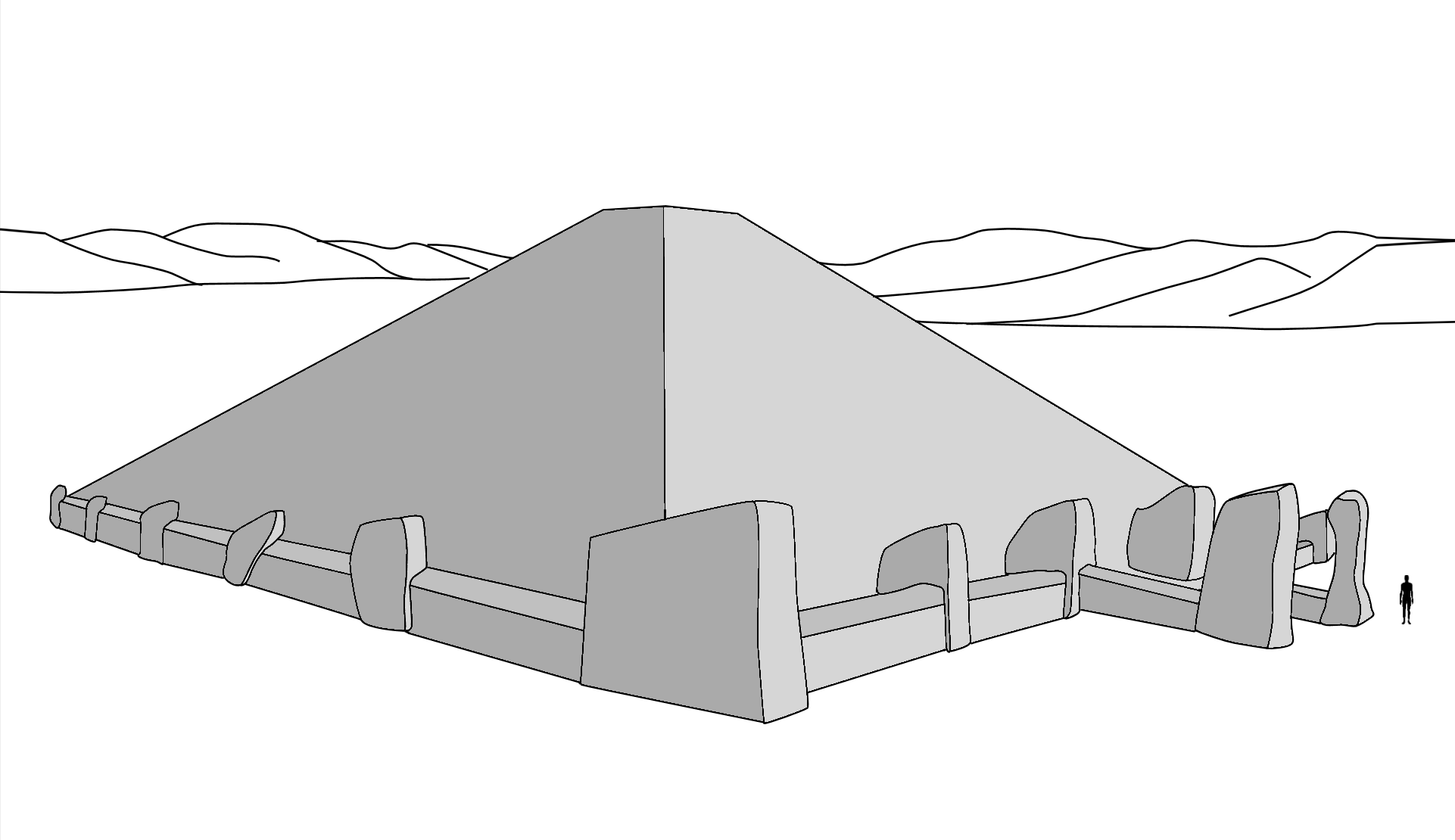
Salbyk kurgan reconstruction.

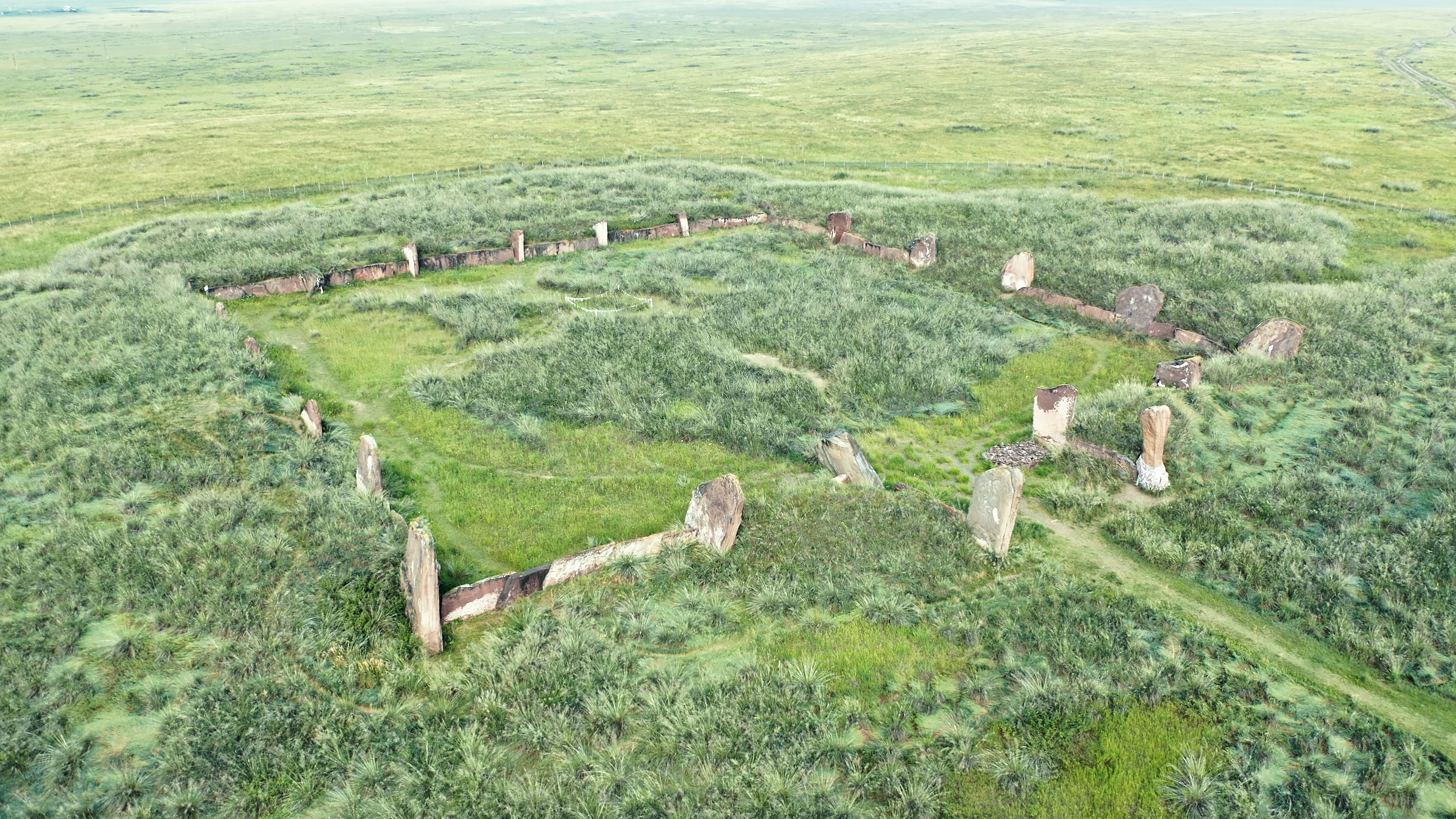
The kurgan today, with only the monumental rocks of the perimeter remaining

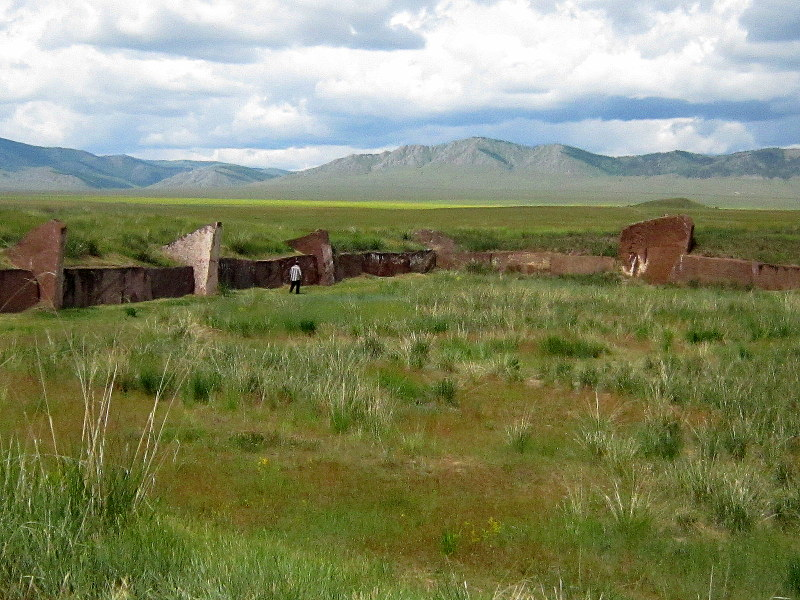
Walled perimeter of the Salbyk kurgan

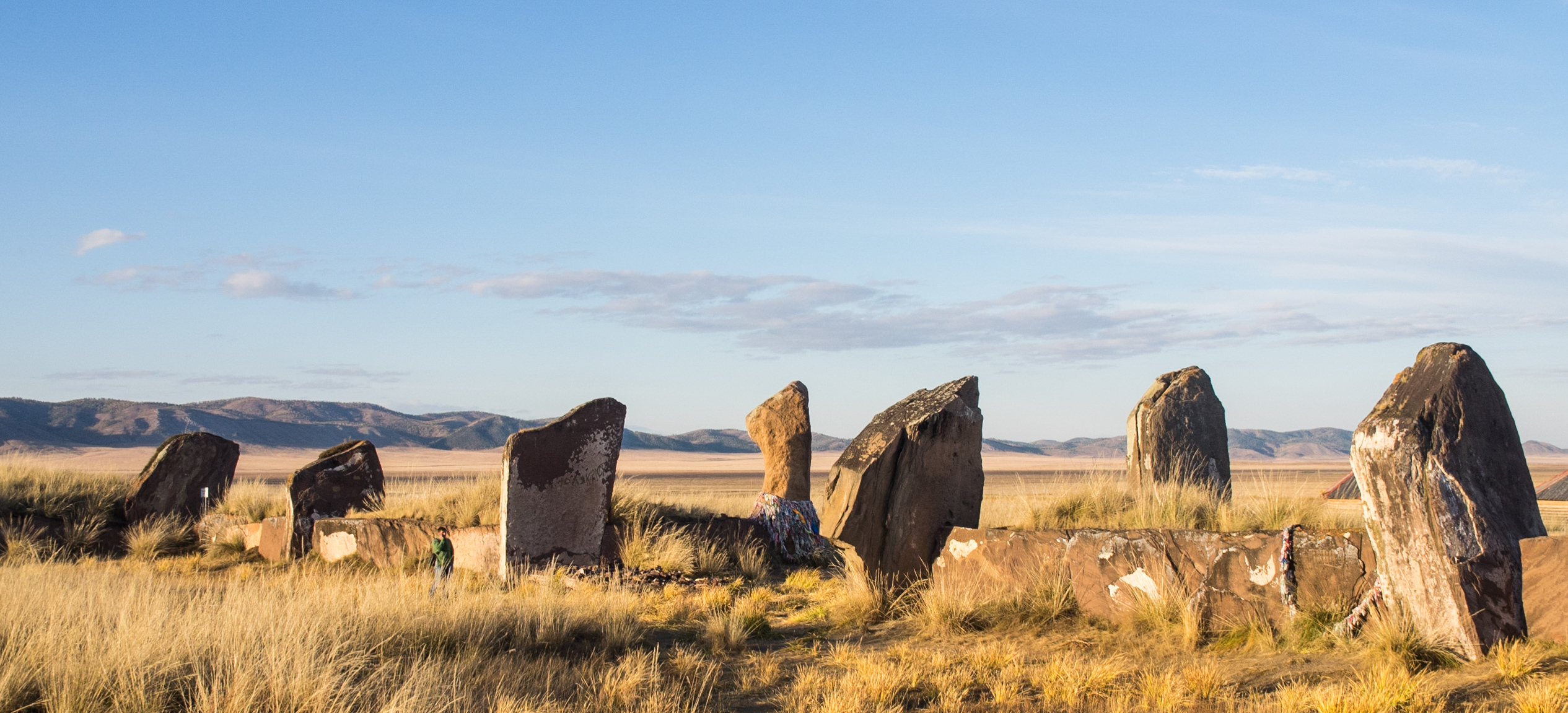
Wall structure and megaliths at the Salbyk kurgan

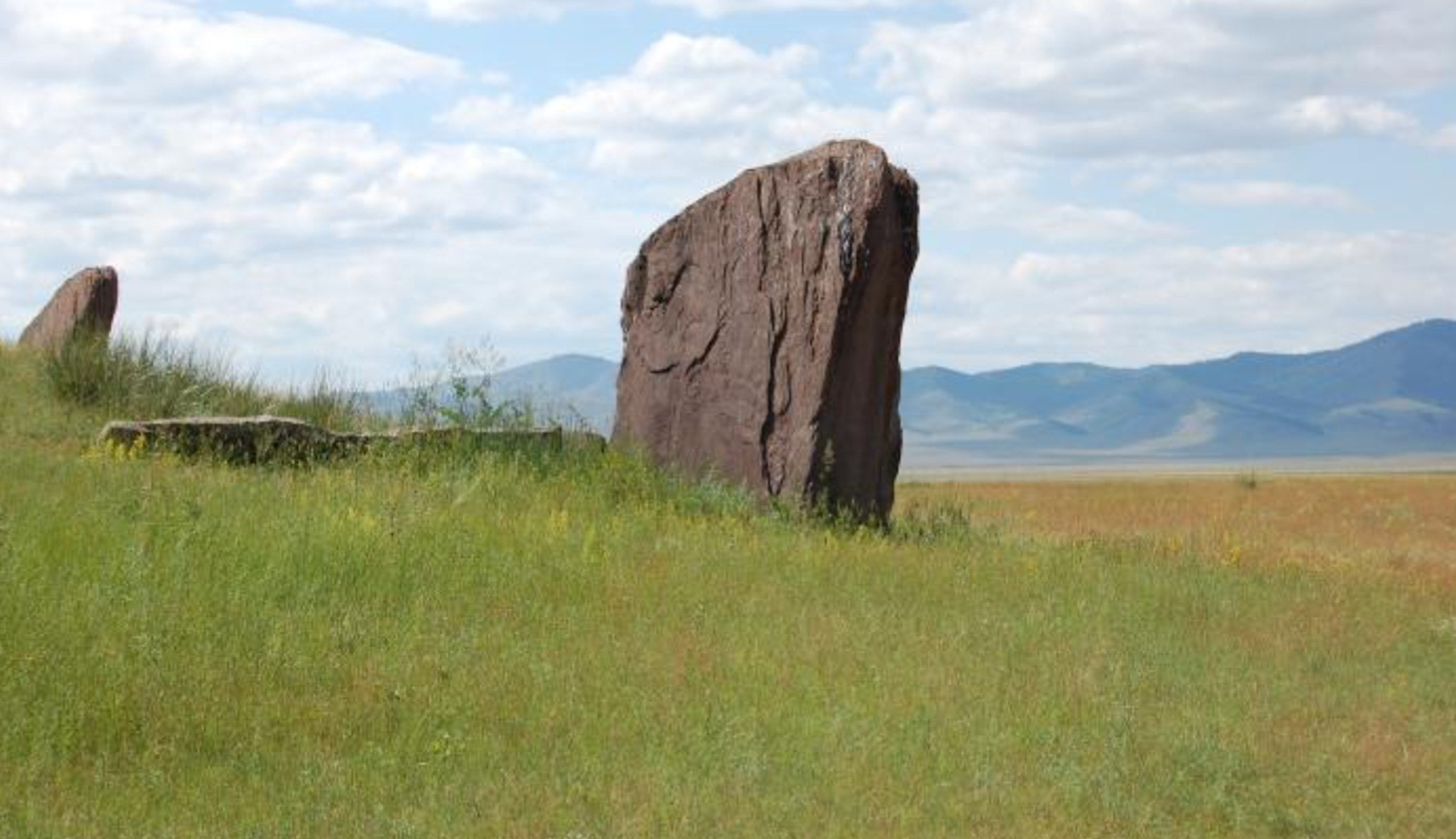
Salbyk kurgan megalith

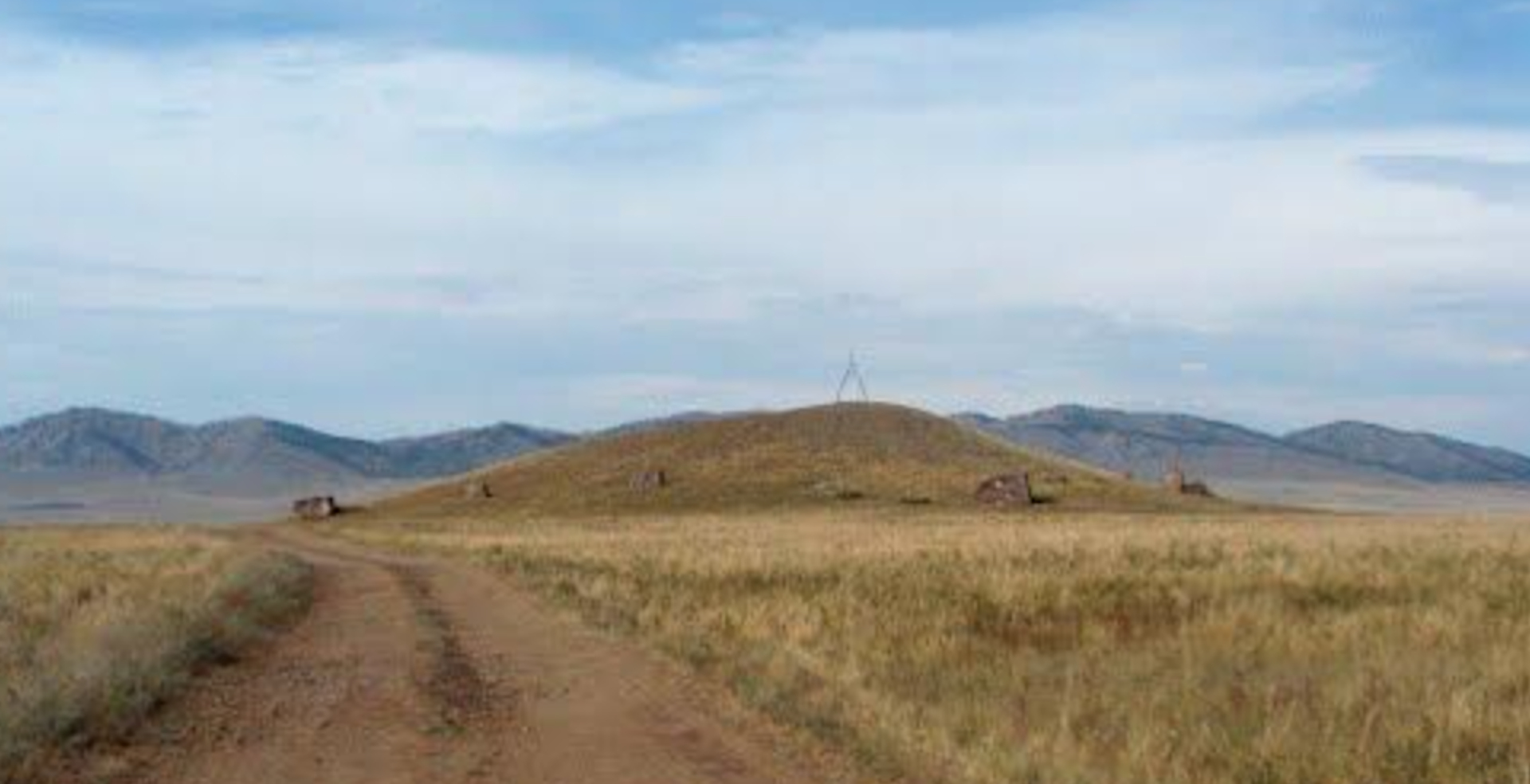
A smaller tumulus, near the Great Salbyk kurgan

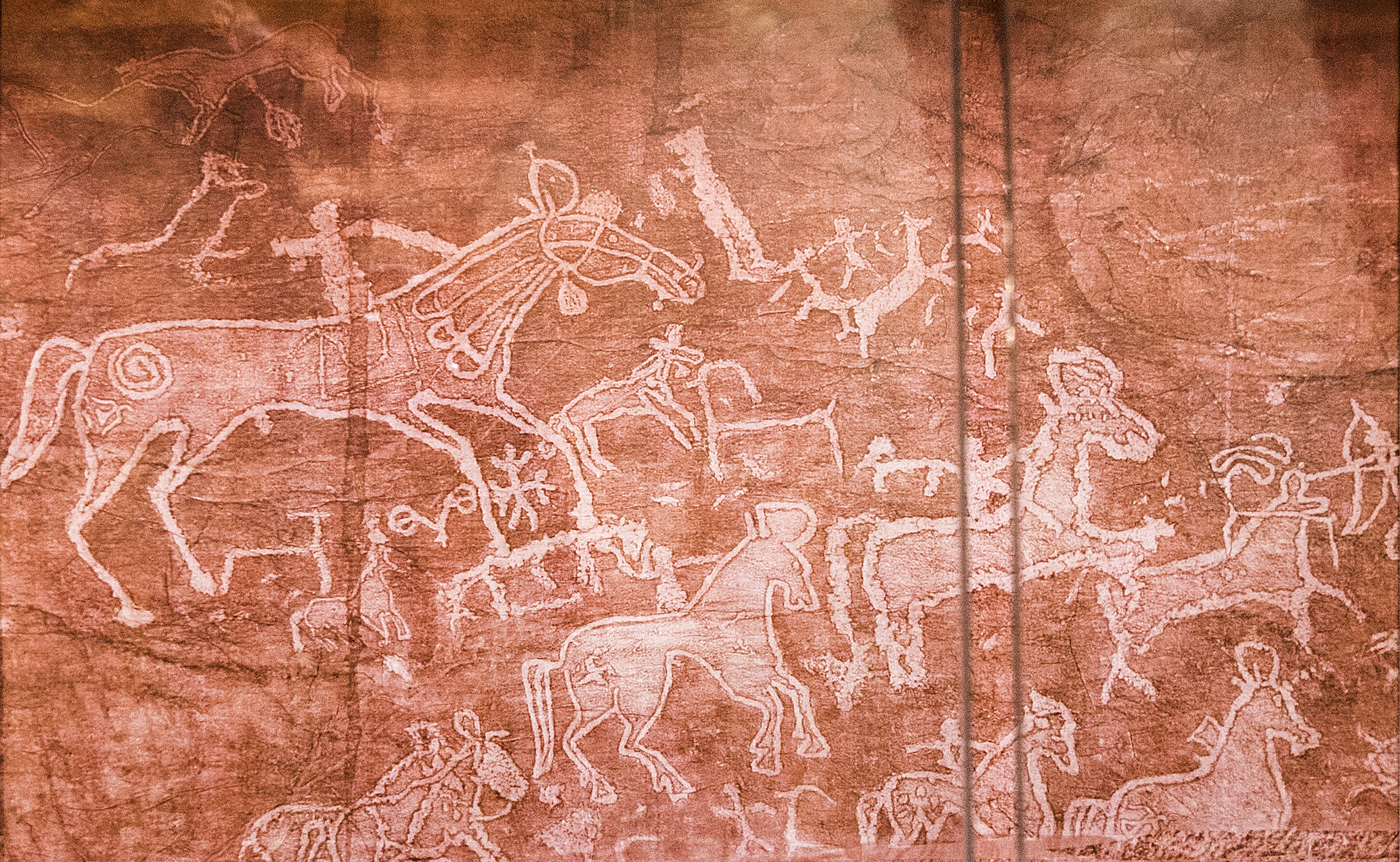
A petroglyph from the Valley of Kings, Salbyk Kurgan Museum

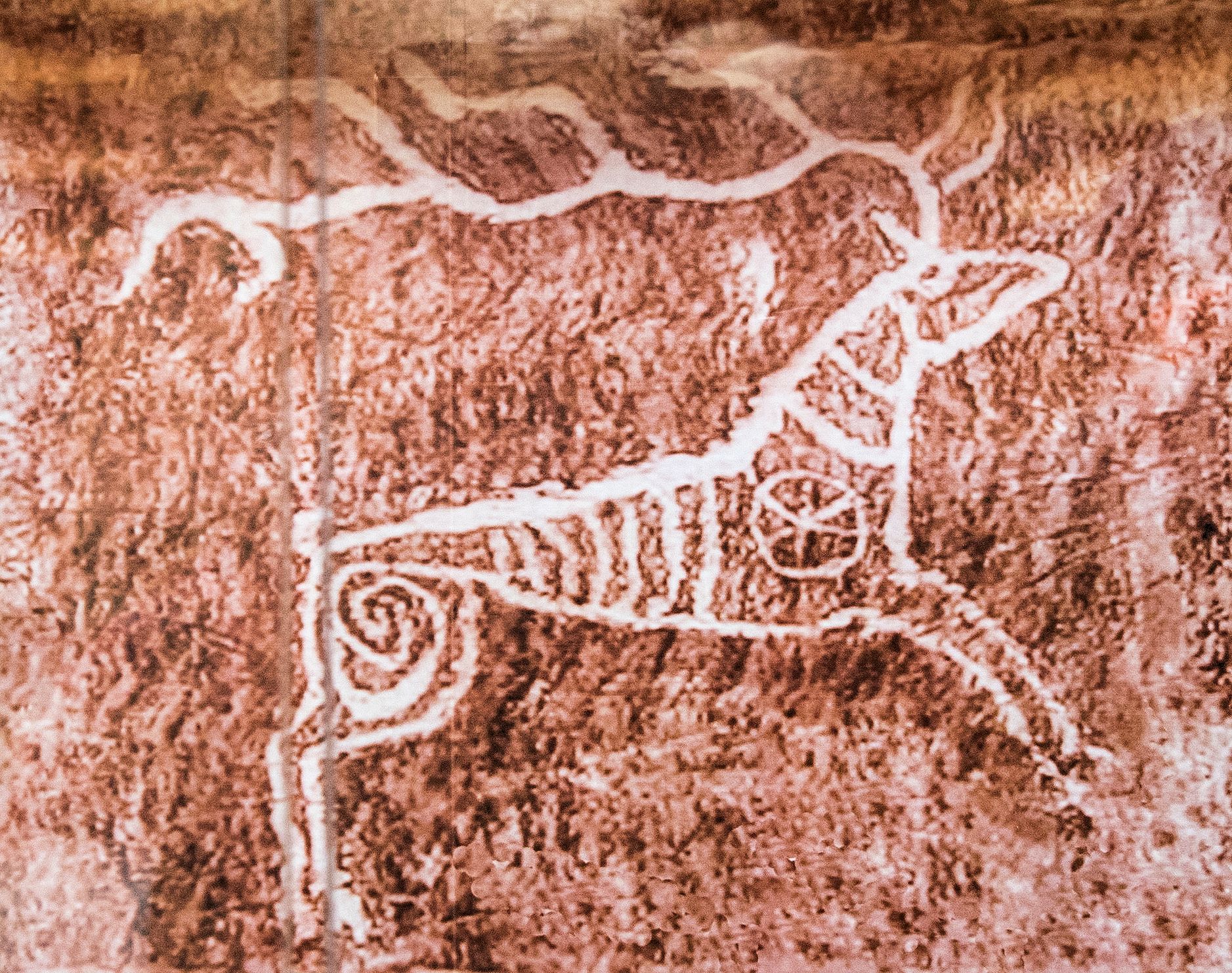
A petroglyph in animal style from the Valley of Kings, Salbyk Kurgan Museum

== See also ==
- Arzhan kurgan
- Pazyryk kurgan
