= Pazyryk tattoos =

Corpus of tattoos on Siberian mummies

Pazyryk tattoos are a corpus of tattooed designs preserved on mummified human remains from the Pazyryk culture (c. 400-200 BCE). Seven tattooed individuals have been recovered from kurgan burials at sites in and around the Altai Mountains of Siberia and Mongolia, where permafrost conditions enabled exceptional preservation of skin and soft tissue. The tattoos are executed in the Scytho-Siberian Animal Style, featuring stylized depictions of real and fantastical animals, and are believed to have encoded information about social status, gender, and religious beliefs. Pazyryk tattooing practices are linked to earlier and later traditions across Central and Inner Asia, including the deer stones of Mongolia and tattooed mummies of the Tarim Basin.

== Pazyryk Culture ==
The Pazyryk culture (Russian: Пазырыкская культура) is a nomadic Iron Age archaeological culture located within the northeasternmost reaches of the Scytho-Siberian world. The culture, named after the type-site of Pazyryk excavated by M. P. Gryaznov in 1929 and by S. I. Rudenko in the 1940s, is linked to more than 20 archaeological sites distributed in and around the Altai Mountains of Siberia and Mongolia, including the famous site of Berel. Known primarily from their kurgan burials, many of these sites are notable for their exceptional preservation of human remains, textiles, and wooden objects due to permafrost conditions, enabling the detailed study of otherwise perishable elements of material culture such as tattoos.

== Tattoos ==
Tattooing was a key element of Pazyryk custom, as evidenced by the well-preserved mummified human remains interred in kurgan burials at three archaeological sites in Russia (Pazyryk, Ak-Alakha 3, Verkh-Kaldzhin 2) and one site in Mongolia (Olon-Kurin-Gol 10), comprising a total of seven individuals which were likely representatives of a broader tradition only preserved through relatively rare mummification events. In order to distinguish the tattoos, many of which had become nearly or completely invisible as the skin darkened over time and as result of post-excavation decomposition, the Pazyryk mummies were photographed using visible, infrared and near-infrared lighting.

=== Description ===
Pazyryk tattoos are most notable for their depiction of animal scenes. Their design is often curvilinear, exaggerated, and highly stylized, as is characteristic of Scytho-Siberian Animal Style art. Animals depicted include real species (e.g. deer, fish, birds, horses, tigers, snow leopards) and fantastical creatures (e.g. horse-griffins). Within this genre, fighting scenes are one of the most common themes, as can be seen on a female individual from the 5th Pazyryk burial mound at the culture’s type site.

=== Technique ===
The precise techniques and toolkit used by Pazyryk tattoo artists are largely unknown, and no definitive tattooing tools have been found associated with tattooed burials. However, X-ray and near-infrared analyses indicate that the tattoos were formed through skin-pricking with both multi-point and single-point tools and application of a colorant, likely soot from burned vegetative material, with individual tattoos sometimes being the result of multiple tattooing sessions. Variations in technical skill suggest that tattooing was a specialized craft, with practitioners operating at different levels of expertise.

Tattoo placement is concentrated on the arms and legs, extending onto the back and hands in some cases, with higher concentrations of tattoos being associated with more elite figures, though tattooing itself was not restricted to a particular social class. Those on the hands are almost exclusively situated on the thumbs; this has been posited to connect with the thumbs' importance as a container of the human soul, as reflected in Altaic folklore.

== Cultural significance ==
Pazyryk tattooing practices, and their associated Animal Style art, have been linked to a number of similar preceding, contemporary, and succeeding traditions in Mongolia, the Tarim Basin, and the Altai itself. The style and content of the tattoos closely resembles that which appears on Bronze Age and Early Iron Age Mongolian deer stones. Earlier tattooing practices have also been recorded among individuals from the sites of Shengjindian, Zaghunluq, and Qizilchoqa, all located along the edges of the Tarim Basin. Most notably, the mummy of a Subeshi individual from Shengjindian Cemetery has fish tattoos on each finger of its hand, which has drawn comparisons to the fish tattoo of a mummy from the Pazyryk site. This tattooing tradition continued into later periods, as demonstrated by a mummy from the Late Iron Age Tashtyk site of Oglakhty in Khakassia.

Pazyryk tattoos may have functioned as a non-textual sign system, encoding information about social status, role, and identity—marking elite standing, warrior status, or kinship affiliations. The tattoo repertoire also varied by gender: men’s designs typically featured steppe animals and extended onto the legs, while women’s depicted animals native to the Altai and were generally absent from the lower body. Tattoos have also been linked to ritual practice—designs normally hidden by clothing may have been revealed during ceremonies, or may have signaled devotion to particular deities or spirits. However, post-mortem surgical cuts through tattooed skin suggest that this ritual function ended with the bearer’s death. Dot-shaped tattoos on the most heavily tattooed Pazyryk individual have also been suggested to have served a therapeutic purpose paralleling that of acupuncture.
