= Pazyryk culture =

Saka nomadic Iron Age archaeological culture

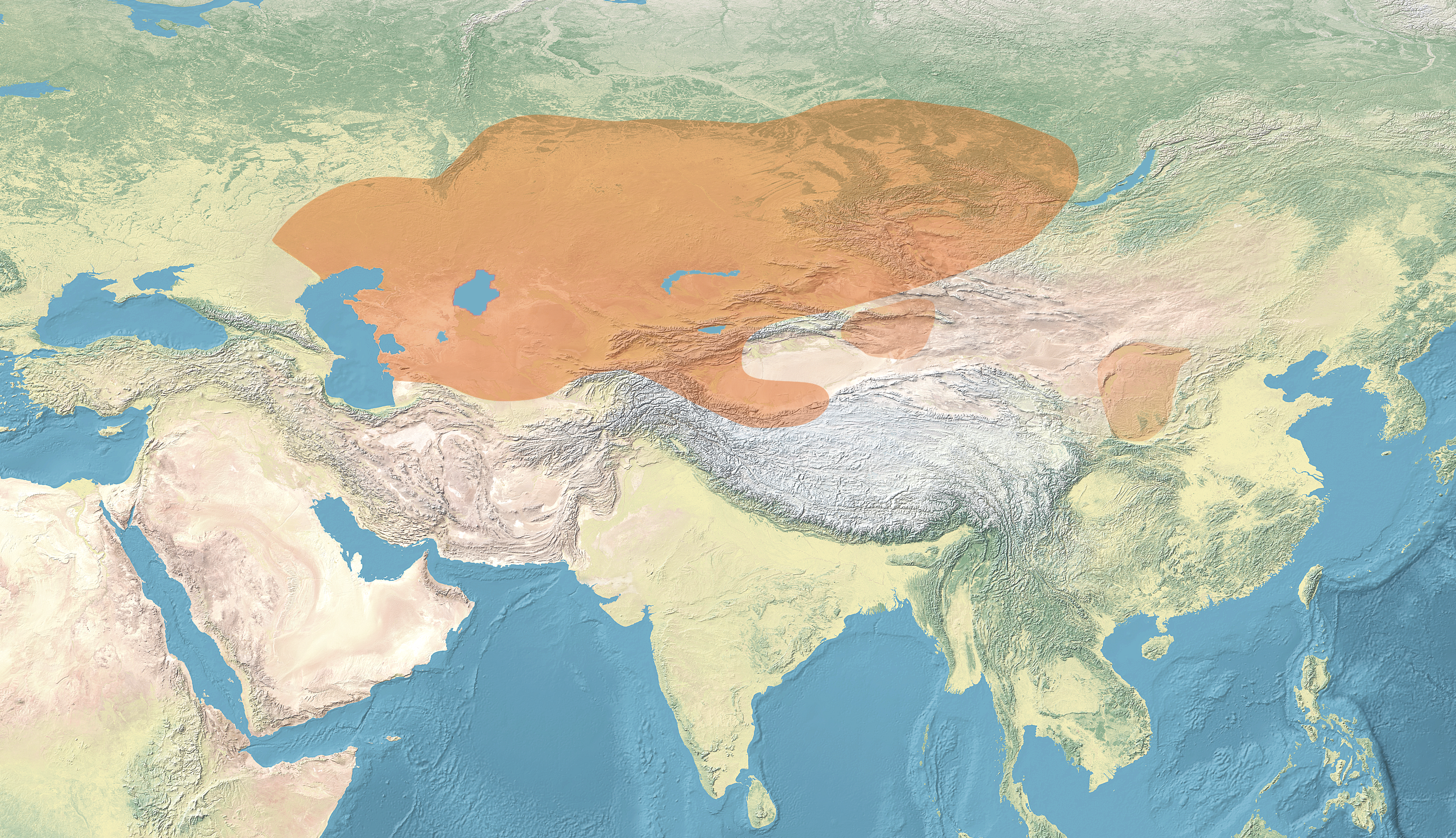
- General location of the Pazyryk culture within the Saka realm ( ), and contemporary Asian polities c. 325 BC
- Geographical range: South Siberia
- Dates: 6th to 3rd centuries BC
- Preceded by: Arzhan culture, Karakol culture
- Followed by: Xiongnu, Tashtyk culture, Bulan-Koba culture

The Pazyryk culture (Russian: Пазырыкская культура Pazyrykskaya kul'tura) is a Saka (Central Asian Scythian) nomadic Iron Age archaeological culture (6th to 3rd centuries BC) identified by excavated artifacts and mummified humans found in the Siberian permafrost, in the Altai Mountains, Kazakhstan and Mongolia. The mummies are buried in long barrows (or kurgans) similar to the tomb mounds of Scythian culture in Ukraine. The type site consists of the Pazyryk burials of the Ukok Plateau. Many artifacts and human remains have been found at this location, including the Siberian Ice Princess, indicating a flourishing culture at this location that benefited from the many trade routes and caravans of merchants passing through the area. The Pazyryk are considered to have had a war-like life. The Pazyryk culture was preceded by the Arzhan culture (Initial Scythian period, 8th–7th century BC).

== Archaeology ==
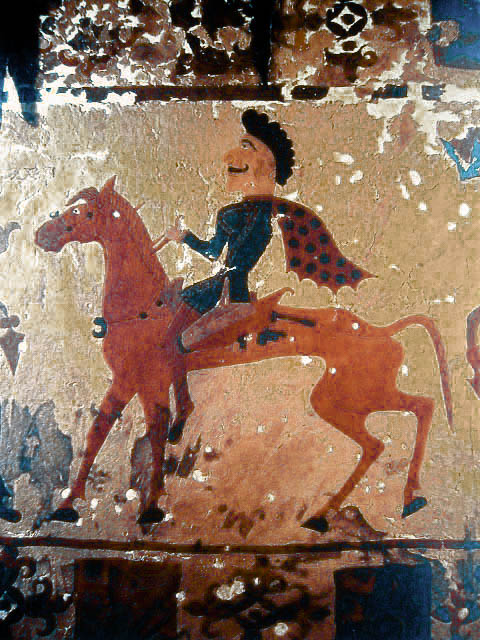
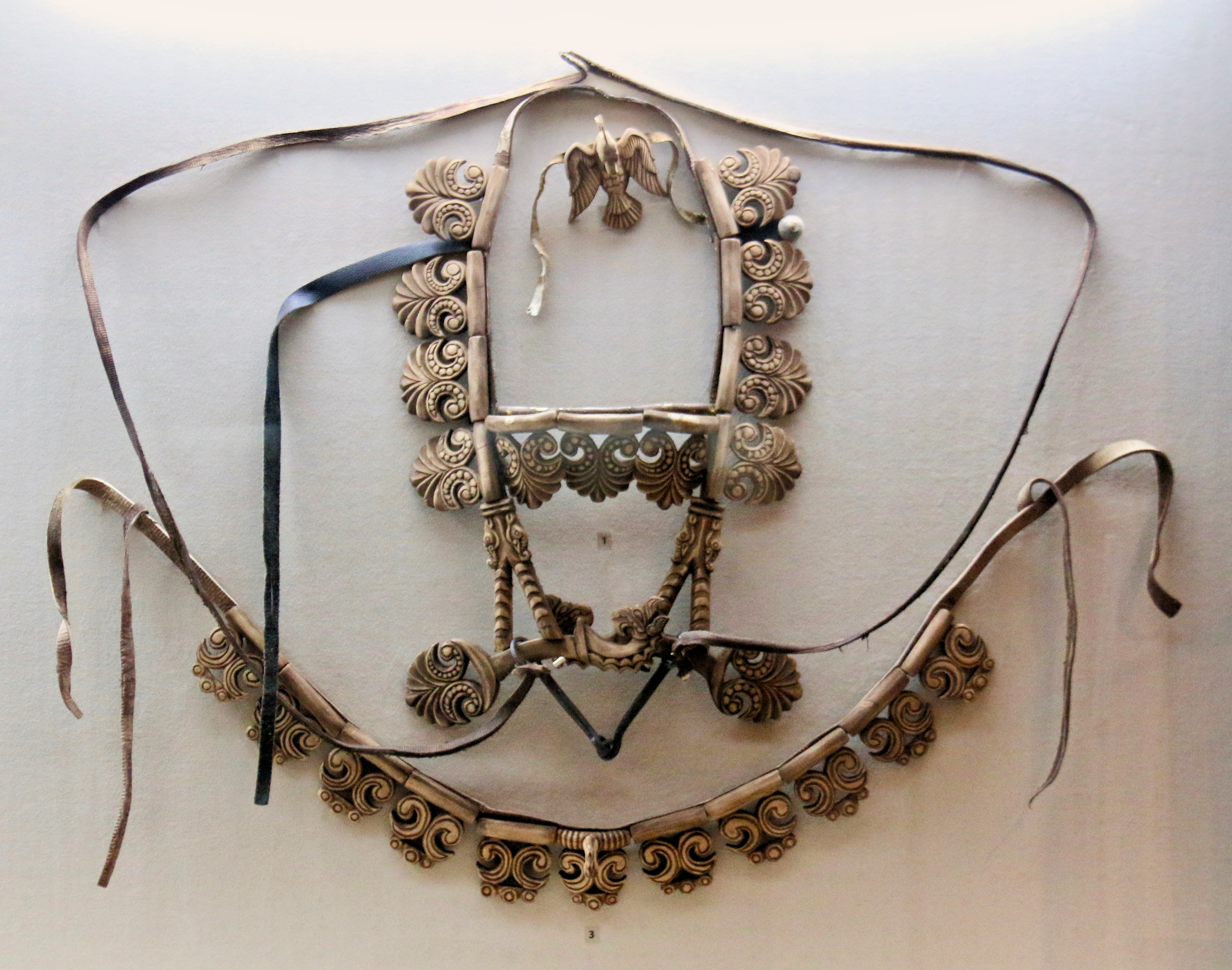
Horseman on a Pazyryk felt carpet (c. 300 BC), and a horse harness from the tomb of the Siberian Ice Maiden (5th-4th century BC)

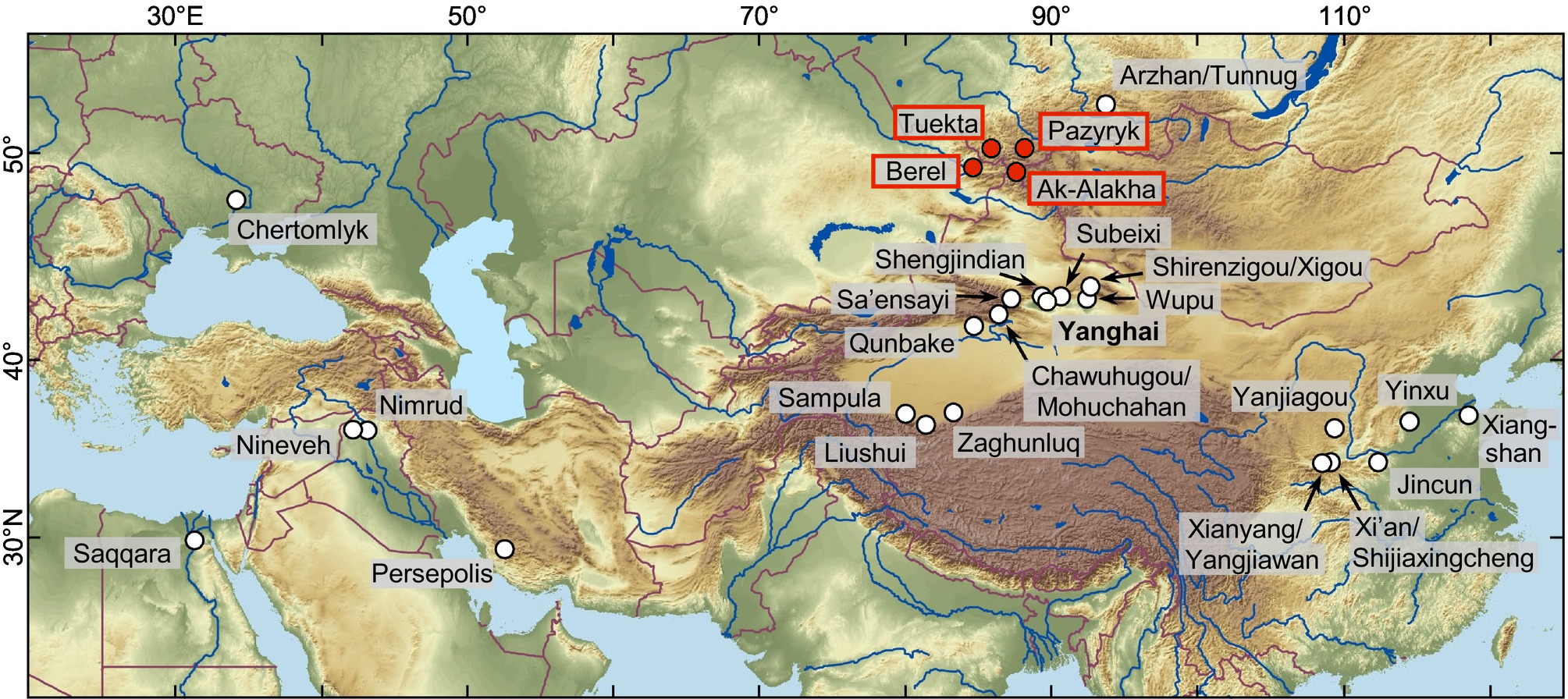
The Pazyryk cultural area, including burials sites of Pazyryk, Berel, Tuekta and Ak-Alakha.

Other kurgan cemeteries associated with the culture include those of Bashadar, Tuekta, Ulandryk, Polosmak, or Berel. There are so far no known sites of settlements associated with the burials, suggesting a purely nomadic lifestyle.

Because of a freak climatic freeze, some of the Altai burials, notably those of the 5th century BC at Pazyryk and neighbouring sites, such as Katanda, Shibe, and Tuekta, were isolated from external climatic variations by a protective layer of ice that conserved the organic substances buried in them. At Pazyryk these included the bodies of horses and an embalmed man whose body was covered with tattoos of animal motifs. The remarkable textiles recovered from the Pazyryk burials include the oldest woolen knotted-pile carpet known, the oldest embroidered Chinese silk, and two pieces of woven Persian fabric (State Hermitage Museum, St. Petersburg). Red and ochre predominate in the carpet, the main design of which is of riders, stags, and griffins. Many of the Pazyryk felt hangings, saddlecloths, and cushions were covered with elaborate designs executed in appliqué feltwork, dyed furs, and embroidery. Of exceptional interest are those with animal and human figural compositions, the most notable of which are the repeat design of an investiture scene on a felt hanging and that of a semihuman, semibird creature on another (both in the State Hermitage Museum, St. Petersburg). Clothing, whether of felt, leather, or fur, was also lavishly ornamented.

Horse reins either had animal designs cut out on them or were studded with wooden ones covered in gold foil. Their tail sheaths were ornamented, as were their headpieces and breastpieces. Some horses were provided with leather or felt masks made to resemble animals, with stag antlers or rams' horns often incorporated in them. Many of the trappings took the form of iron, bronze, and gilt wood animal motifs either applied or suspended from them; and bits had animal-shaped terminal ornaments. Altai-Sayan animals frequently display muscles delineated with dot and comma markings, a formal convention that may have derived from appliqué needlework. Such markings are sometimes included in Assyrian, Achaemenian, and even Urartian animal representations of the ancient Middle East. Roundels containing a dot serve the same purpose on the stag and other animal renderings executed by contemporary Śaka metalworkers. Animal processions of the Assyro-Achaemenian type also appealed to many Central Asian tribesmen and are featured in their arts.

Certain geometric designs and sun symbols, such as the circle and rosette, recur at Pazyryk but are completely outnumbered by animal motifs. The stag and its relatives figure as prominently as in Altai-Sayan. Combat scenes between carnivores and herbivores are exceedingly numerous in Pazyryk work; the Pazyryk beasts are locked in such bitter fights that the victim's hindquarters become inverted.

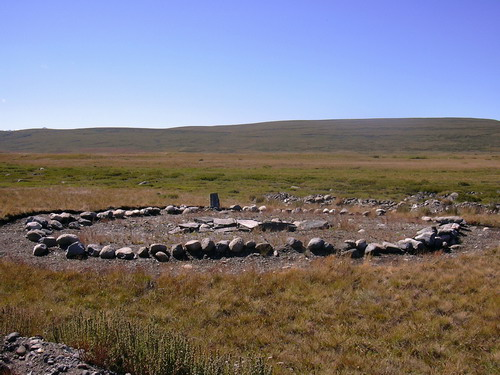
Pazyryk Kurgan

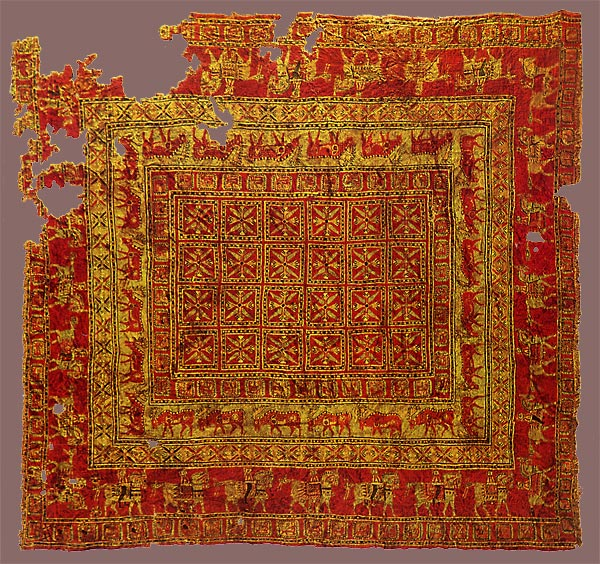
Pazyryk carpet, manufactured in Central Asia or the Near-East.

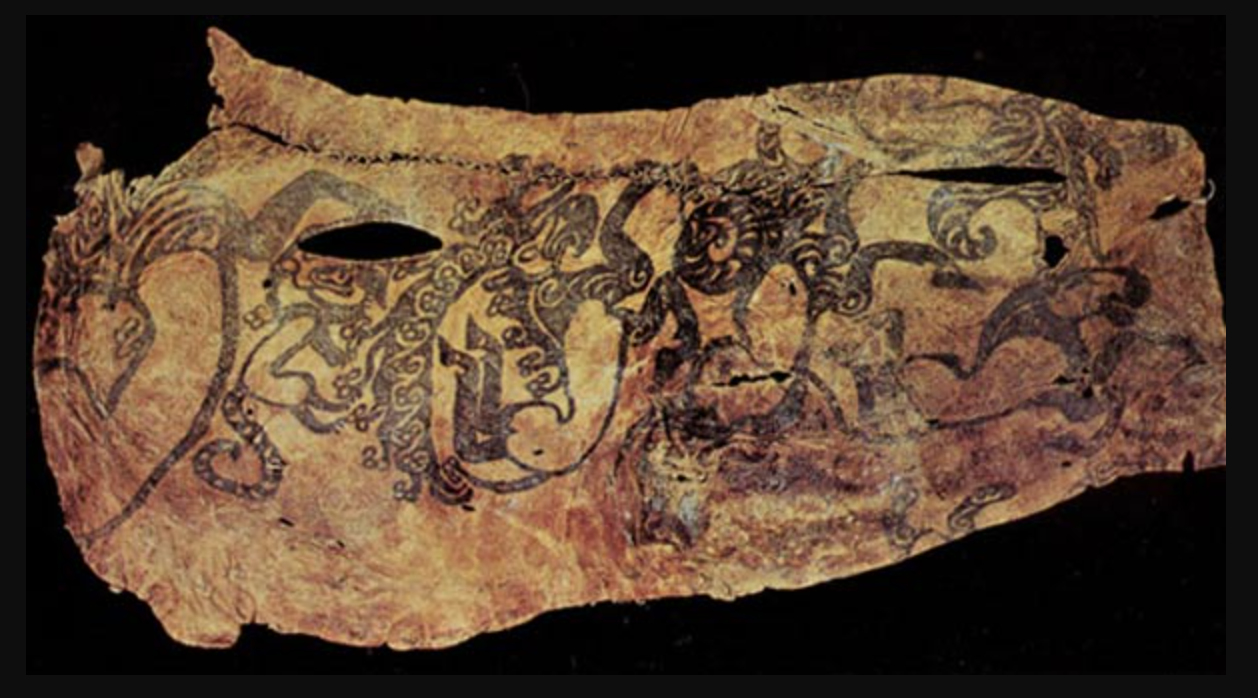
Tattoos of the warrior excavated at Pazyryk, with zoomorphic symbols, 5th-4th century BCE.

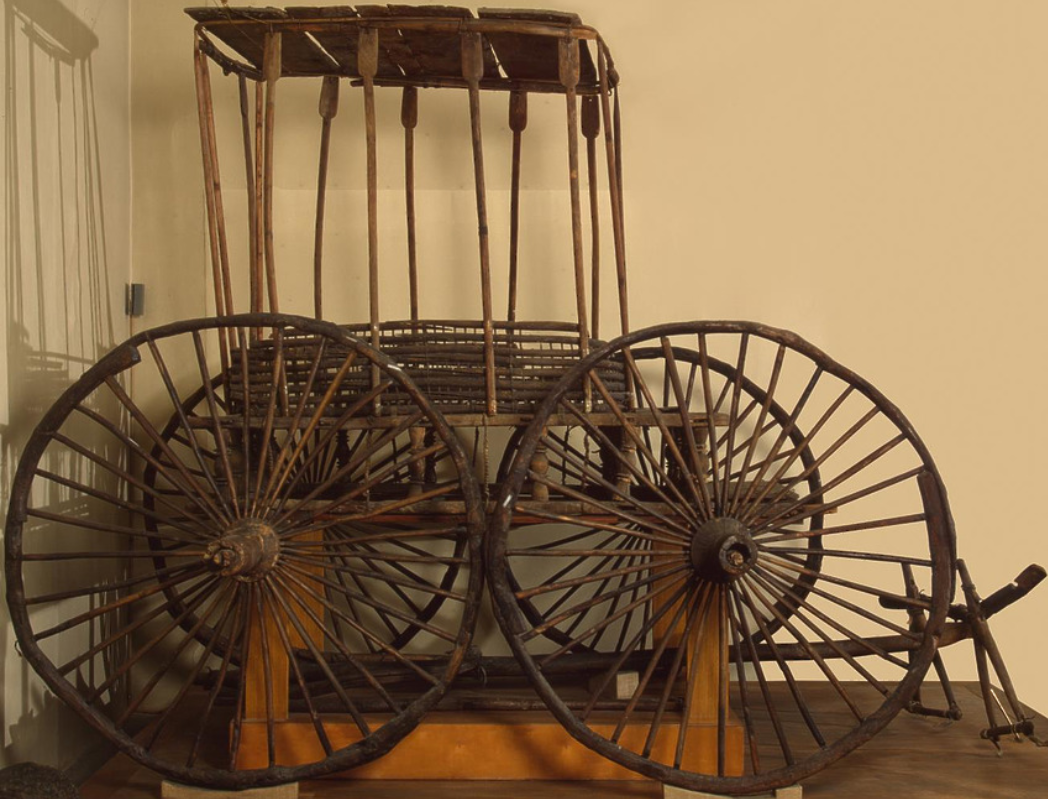
Pazyryk cart, 3rd century BCE.

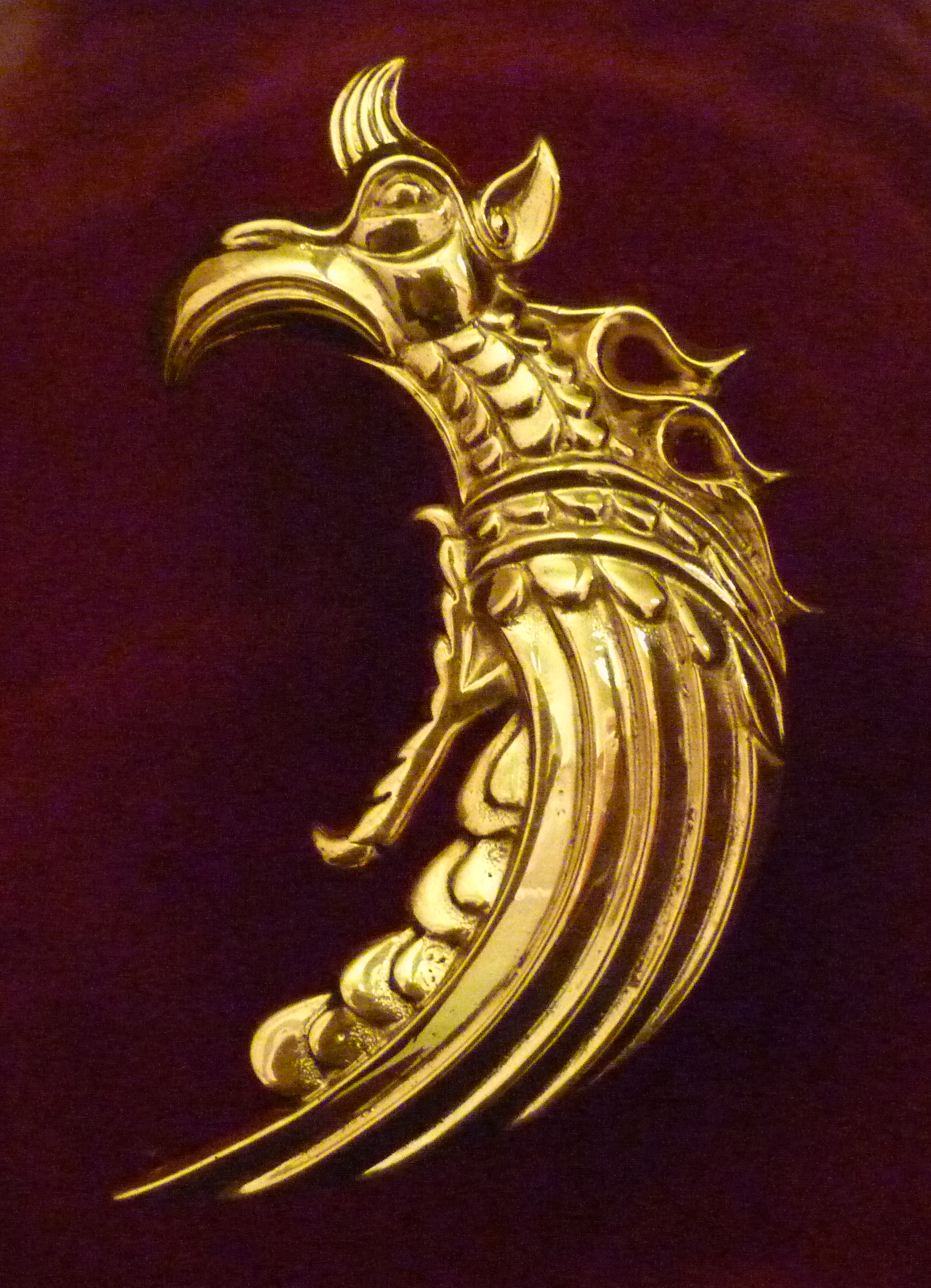
Samruk (Griffin), burial mound of Tuekta (5th century BCE) Altai, Pazyryk culture.

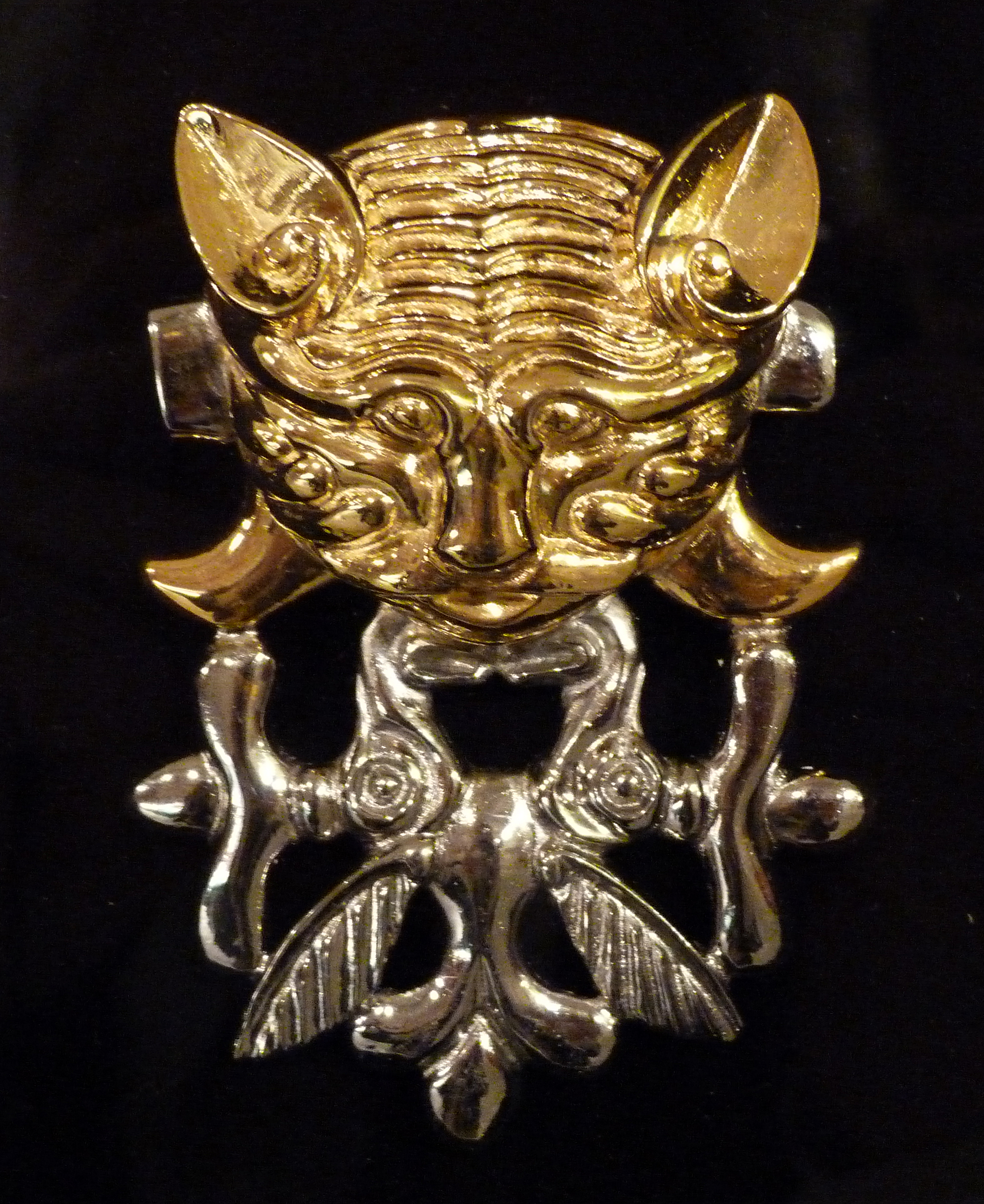
Catlike predator with protomas of two elk, burial mound Berel (IV.-III. BCE) Kazakhstan, Pazyryk culture.

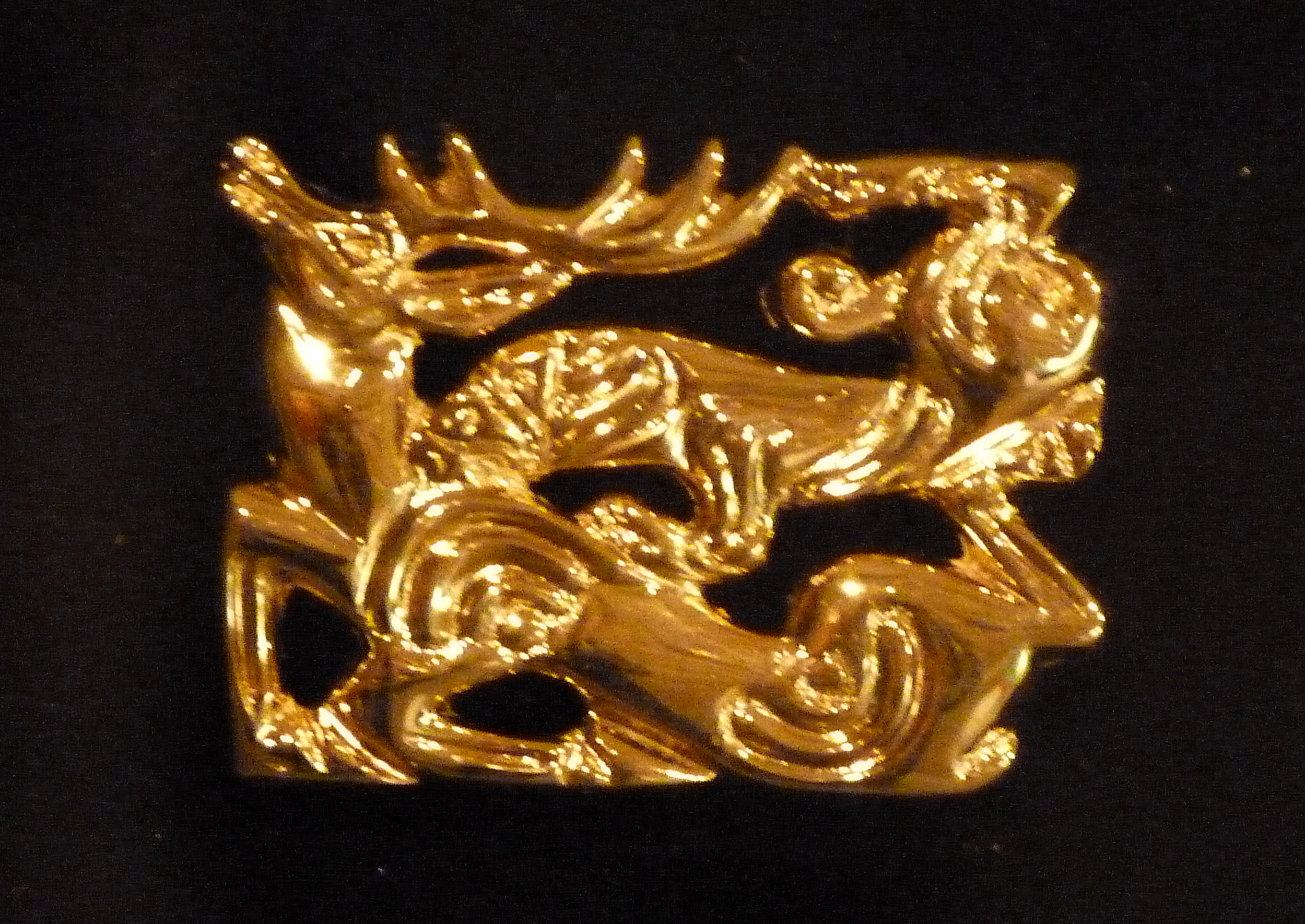
Scene of torment, burial mound Berel (V. - III. BCE) Kazakhstan, Pazyryk culture.

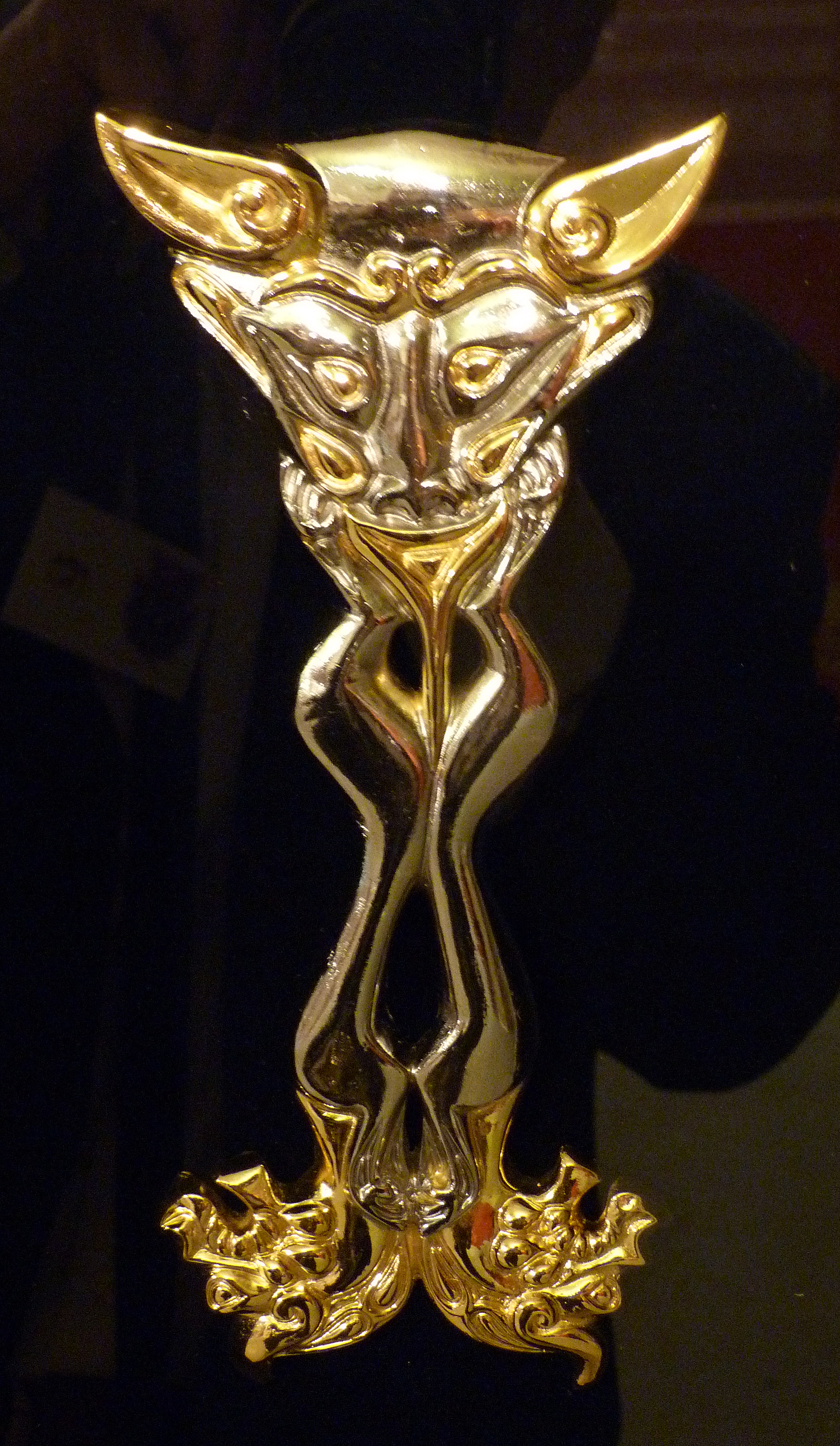
Frontal decoration (harness), burial mound Berel (IV.-III. B.C.) Kazakhstan, Pazyryk culture.

== Genetics ==
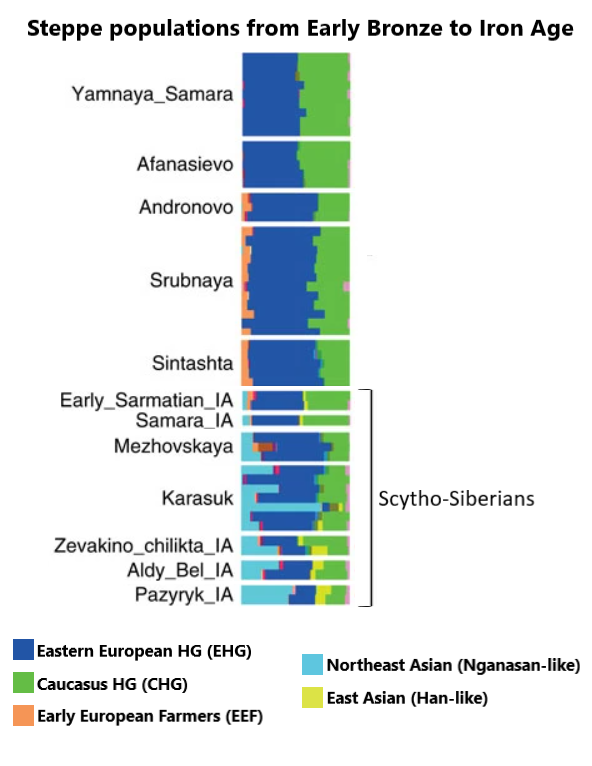
Genetic makeup of Bronze and Iron Age Steppe populations

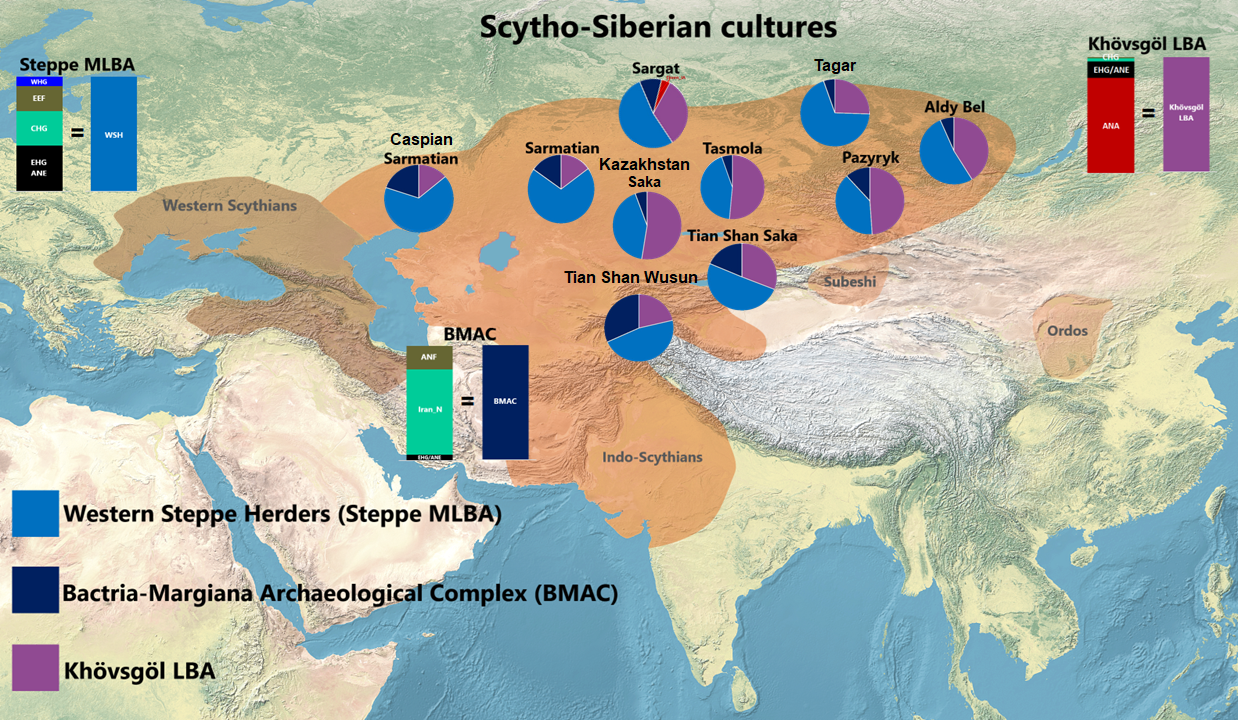
Map of Scythian cultures, including different Saka populations with genetic profiles

The Pazyryk population is associated with the Eastern Scythian horizon, which emerged out of Western Steppe Herders (WSH or Steppe_MLBA) and local groups of Southern Siberia. Genetic data revealed that the Iron Age Pazyryk people were not identical with the WSH but substantially shifted towards East Eurasians. The eastern Eurasian geneflow can largely be explained through Khövsgöl LBA groups, themselves a combination of primarily Ancient Northeast Asians and components associated with Ancient North Eurasians and the Sintashta culture. Some outlier samples need additional geneflow from an Ancient Northeast Asian source, best represented by Neolithic groups from the Devil's Gate Cave site in the Russian Far East. The Pazyryk people display genetic affinites to modern Uralic and Paleosiberian peoples, such as the Yukaghirs, Nganasans, Khanty, and Mansi people. The Pazyryk people were later replaced by expanding Xiongnu. Overall, the Pazyryk population could be modeled to derive between c. 50% from the Khövsgöl LBA source, c. 36% from WSH (Steppe_MLBA), and c. 14% from a BMAC-like source. One outlier specimen (Pazyryk_Berel_50BCE) could be modeled as c. 18% Pazyryk_IA and c. 82% additional Northeast Asian admixture, suggesting that this individual represents a migrant who arrived from further East. The same additional Eastern ancestry is found among the later groups of Huns (Hun Berel 300CE, Hun elite 350CE), and the Karakaba remains (830CE).

=== Maternal haplogroups ===
A 2010 study analyzed Pazyryk burials from the Altai mountains. Three samples of mtDNA extracted belonged to haplogroups U5a1 and HV2 (two samples). In another 2015 study, two individuals were found to belong to the East Eurasian maternal haplogroup C4. Juras, et al. (2017) analyzed the maternal haplogroups of Siberian Scythian remains from Pazyryk, from Altai and Inner Mongolia: 46.7% of the remains carried an East Eurasian haplogroup, while 53.3% carried a West Eurasian haplogroup.

=== Paternal haplogroups ===
Two closely related males from the Pazyryk culture were found to belong to the East Eurasian paternal haplogroup N.

Another Pazyryk specimen was found to belong to the West Eurasian paternal haplogroup R1a-Z93.

== Gallery ==
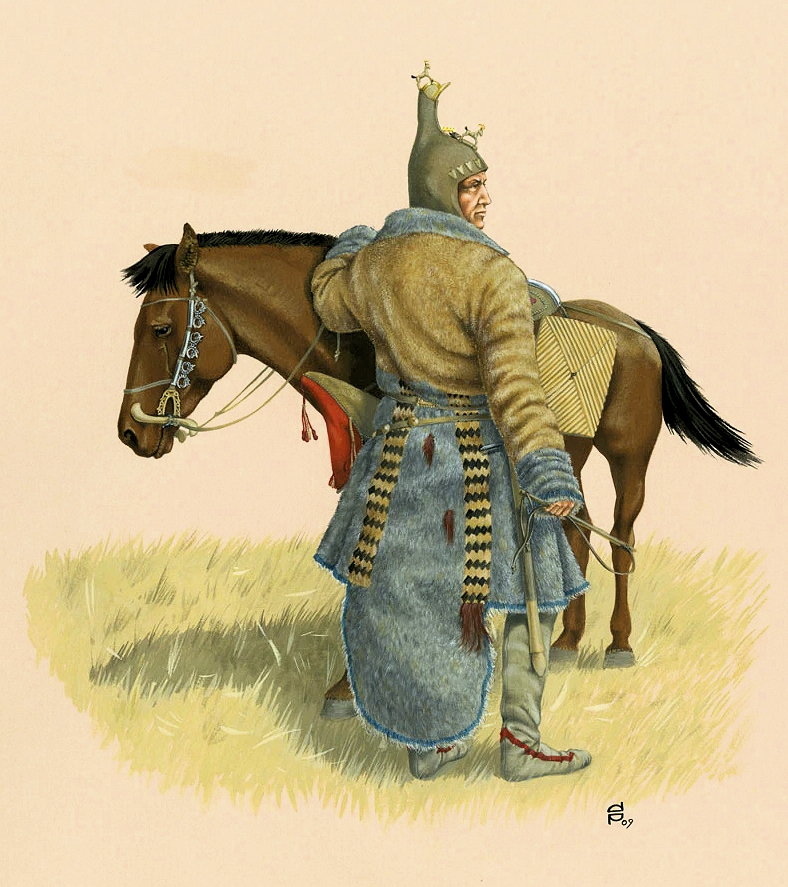
Reconstruction of a Saka, found in the kurgan Olon-Kurin-Gol 10 in Pazyryk

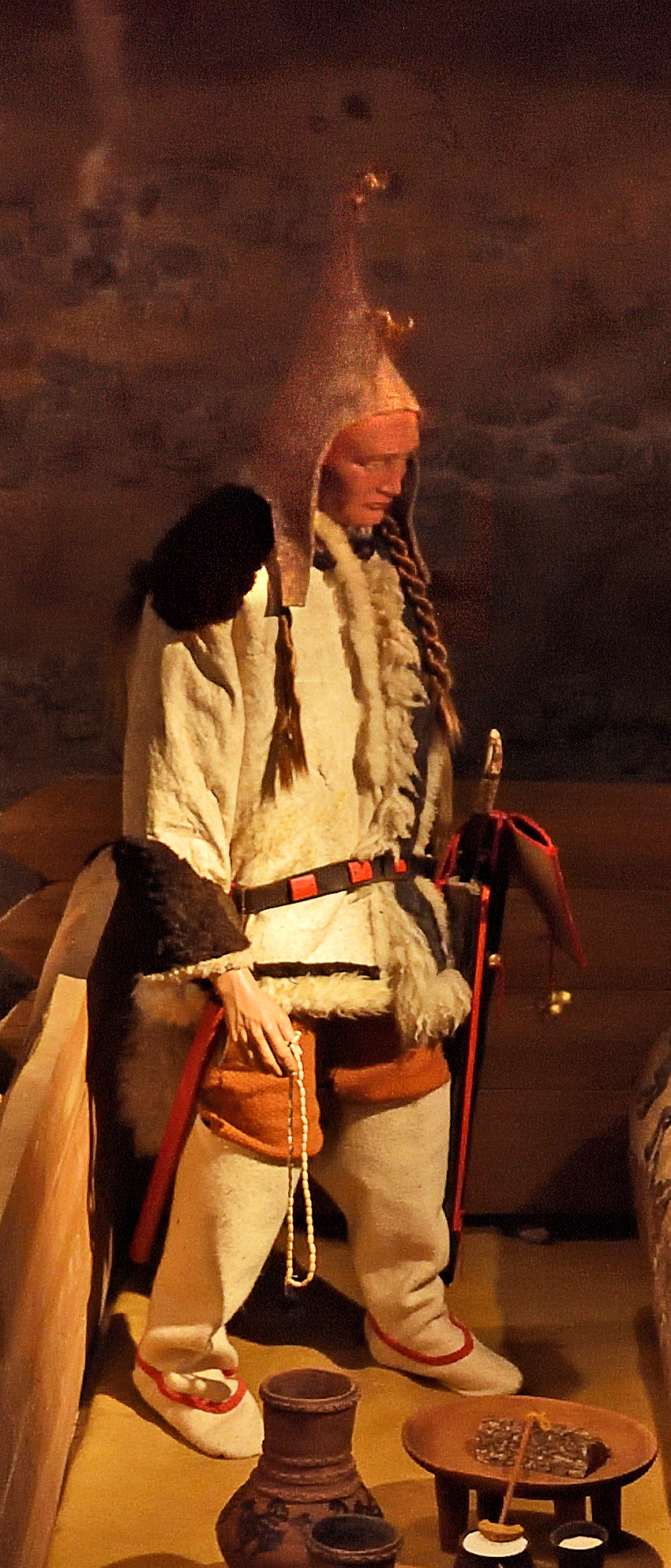
Pazyryk man (reconstruction from burials, Anokhin Museum).

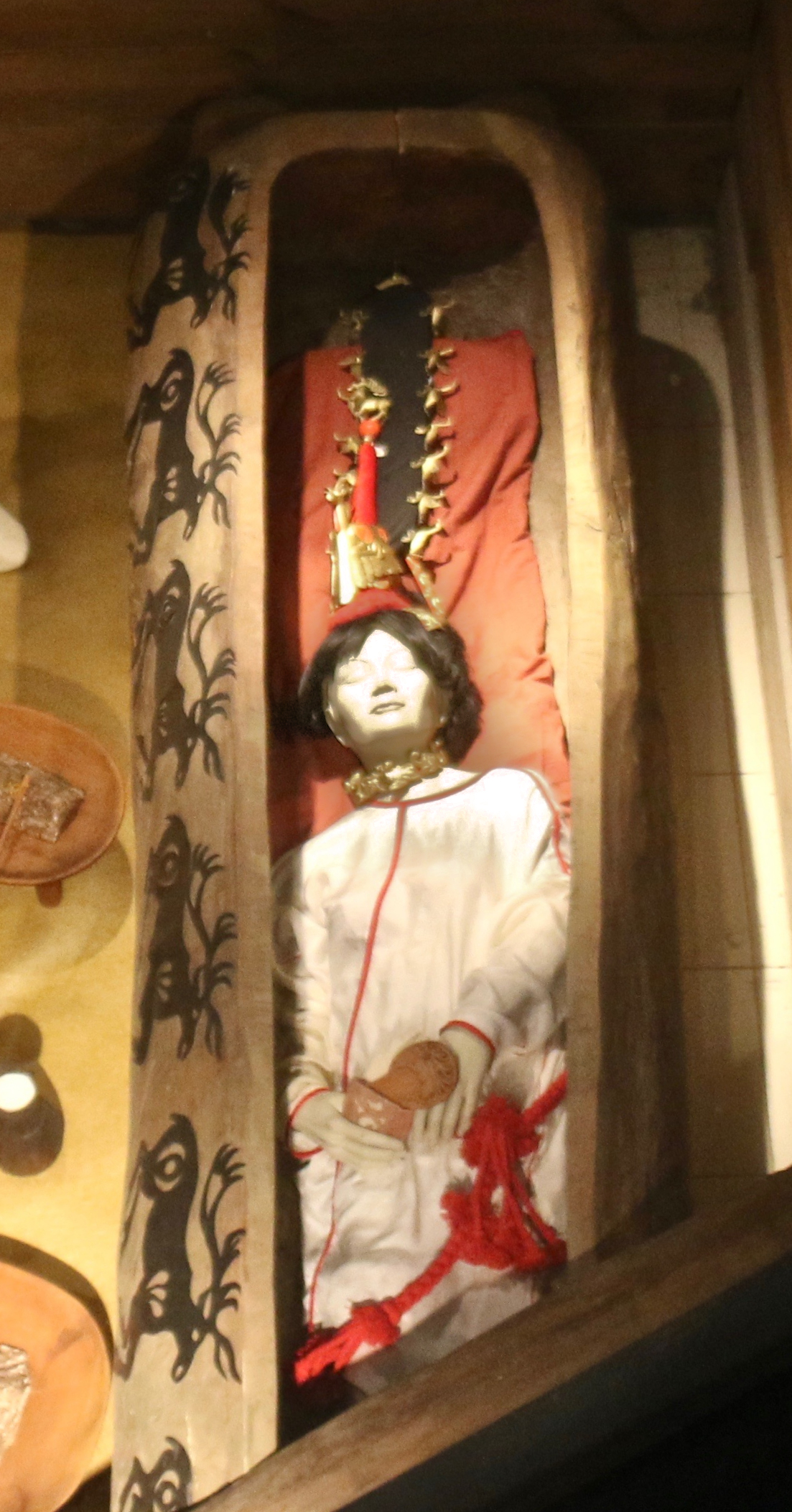
Siberian Ice Maiden inside her wooden sarcophagus (reconstruction from burial, Anokhin Museum).

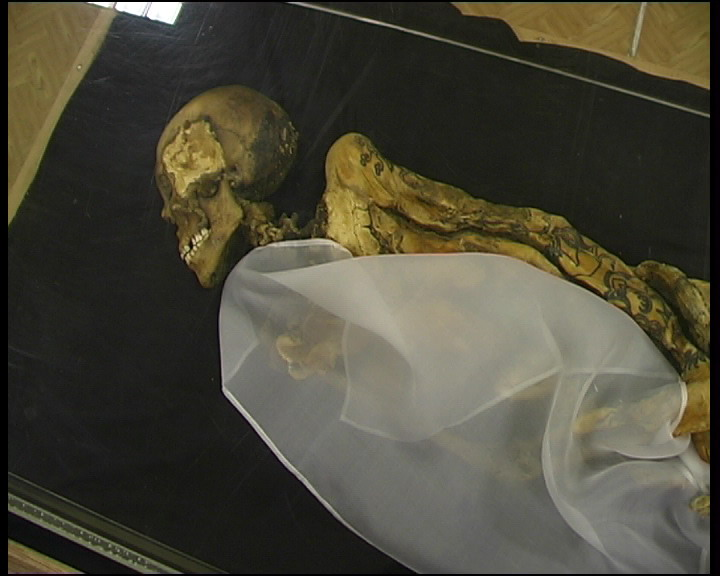
Mummy of the Siberian Ice Maiden

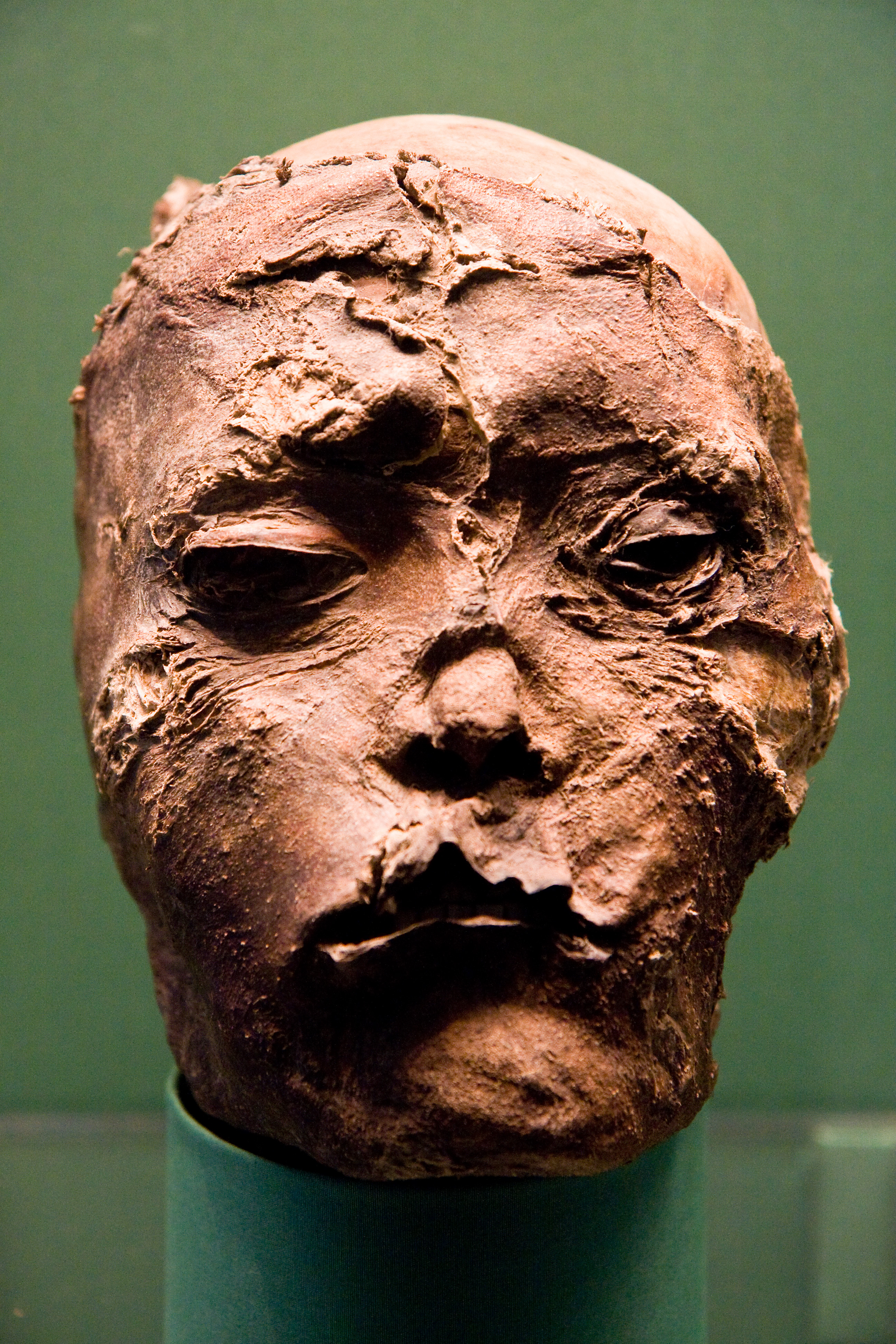
Embalmed head of a clan chieftain. Burial mound 2, Pazyryk. Circa 300 BCE. State Hermitage Museum, St. Petersburg, 1684/29.

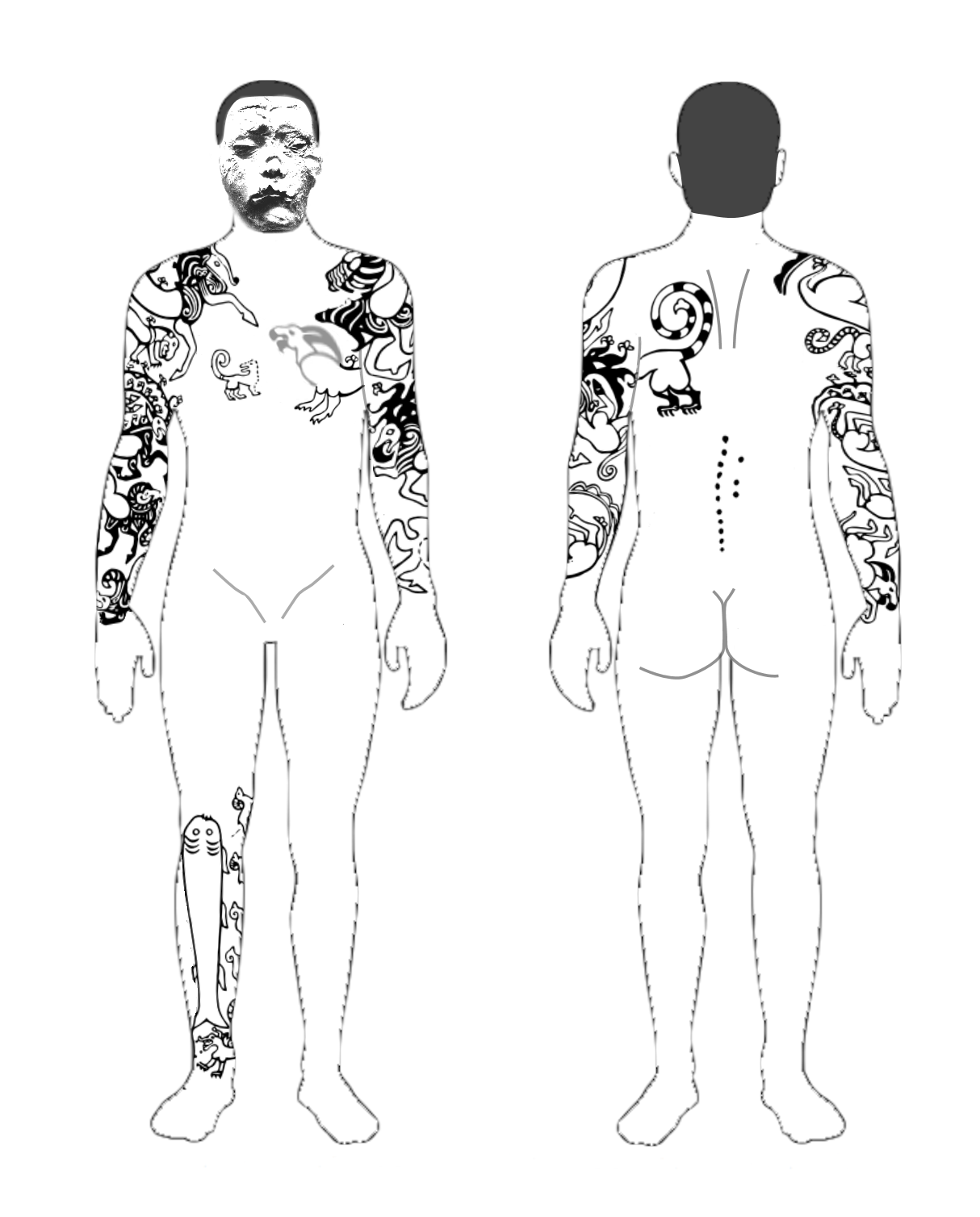
Tattoos of the Pazyryk-2 chief.

== See also ==
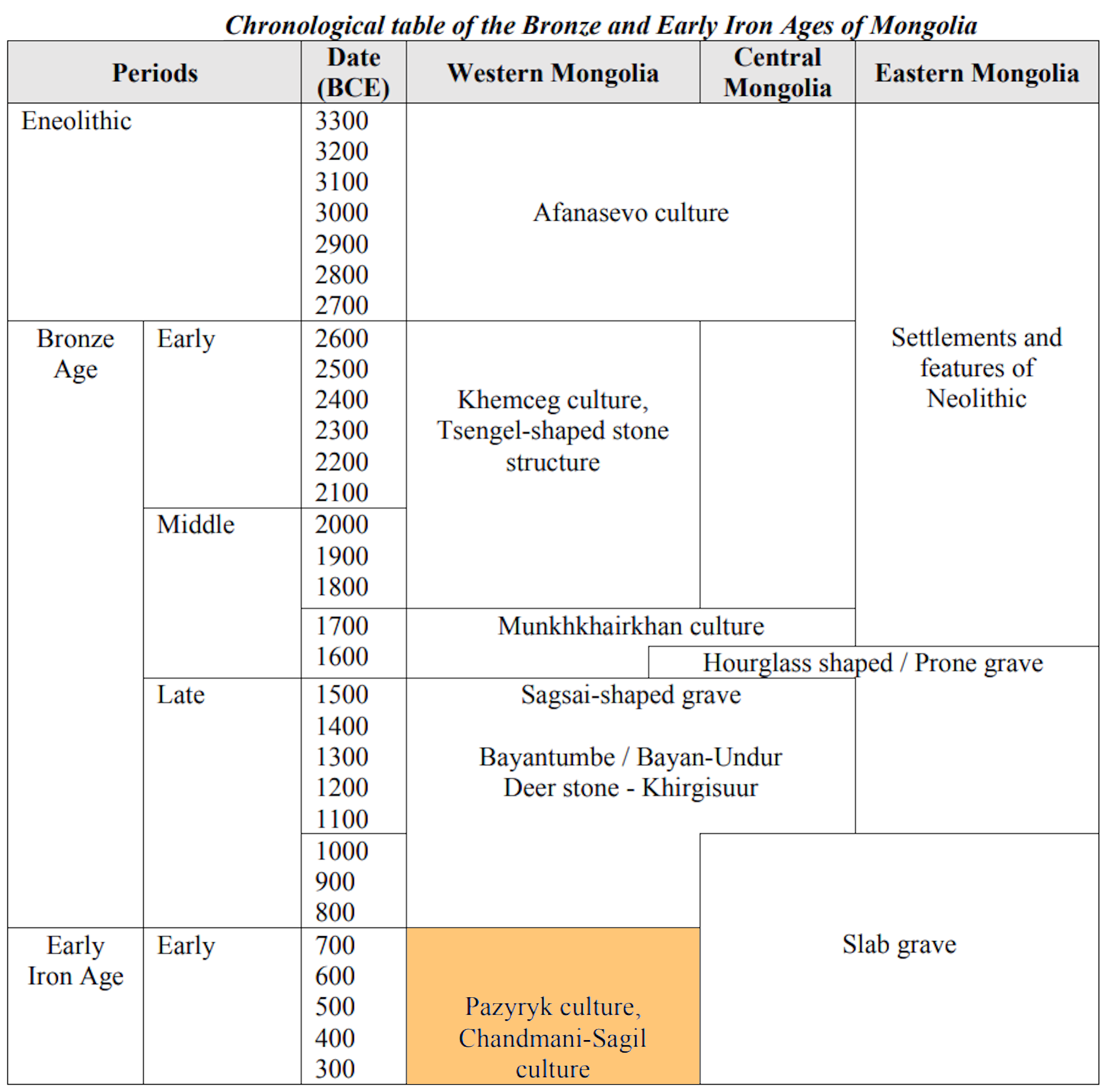
Timeline of the Pazyryk culture and predecessors in western Mongolia

- Aldy-Bel culture
- Bulan-Koba culture
- Karasuk culture
- Pazyryk burials
- Tagar culture
- Tashtyk culture
- Scythians
