= Kok-Pash culture =

Ancient community of southern Siberia

Kok-Pash Culture
- Geographical range: Altai Mountains
- Dates: 3rd to 5th centuries CE
- Major sites: Kok-Pash, Kuraika
- Preceded by: Bulan-Koba culture
- Followed by: First Turkic Khaganate

The Kok-Pash culture (3rd to 5th centuries CE) is an archaeological culture flourishing in the so-called Hunno-Sarmatian period in the Altai Mountains. The Kok-Pash monuments appeared in Altai Mountains in the second half of the 3rd century AD and coexisted with the Bulan-Koba culture.

== Archaeology and Anthropology ==
Contrary to the Europoid groups such as Pazyryk and Bulan-Koba culture, the Kok-Pash skeletal remains exhibit pronounced East Asian (Mongoloid) features, marking a new population influx in Altai mountains from the East in the 3rd century CE.

The Kok-Pash burials share similarities to the Kokel culture in Tuva. in the 3rd century CE the Kok-Pash people annexed parts of territories of the Bulan-Koba culture in south and southeastern parts of the Altai Mountain of Russia and coexisted with the remnants of the Bulan-koba culture in the north and northwestern parts of the Altai Mountains until the 5th century CE. The burials of Kok-Pash culture consists of wooden coffins in narrow pits beneath rectangular mounds with a north–south orientation. grave goods are no different from Bulan-Koba culture. the Kok-Pash and Bulan-koba cultures were both replaced by Turkic burial traditions in Altai mountains.

== Sources ==
- Konstantinov, Nikita; Soenov, Vasilii; Trifanova, Synaru; Svyatko, Svetlana (29 June 2018). "History and culture of the early Türkic period: A review of archaeological monuments in the Russian Altai from the 4th–6th century AD". Archaeological Research in Asia. 16: 103–115. doi:10.1016/j.ara.2018.06.002.
- Khudjakov, Julij S. (1 July 2005). "Armaments of Nomads of the Altai Mountains (First Half of the 1st Millennium AD)". Acta Orientalia Academiae Scientiarum Hungaricae. 58 (2): 117–133. doi:10.1556/aorient.58.2005.2.1.
