= Berel kurgan =

Archeological site in eastern Kazakhstan

Berel
- Location of Berel, with contemporary cultures in the 6th century BCE
- Geographical range: South Siberia
- Dates: 5-3rd centuries BCE
- Major sites: 49.3732082°N 86.4380264°E
- Preceded by: Karasuk culture
- Followed by: Aldy-Bel culture, Pazyryk culture, Tagar culture

Berel kurgan is an archaeological site in the Katonkaragay District in eastern Kazakhstan. The site is located near the village of Berel. At this site, numerous 5th-3rd century BCE Early Saka kurgans were found.

The excavations have revealed artefacts the sophistication of which are encouraging a revaluation of the nomadic cultures of the 5th to 3rd centuries BCE. The Kurgans contained vast quantities of precious golden jewelry.

Horses were buried in the kurgans next to their owner, and were lavishly decorated.

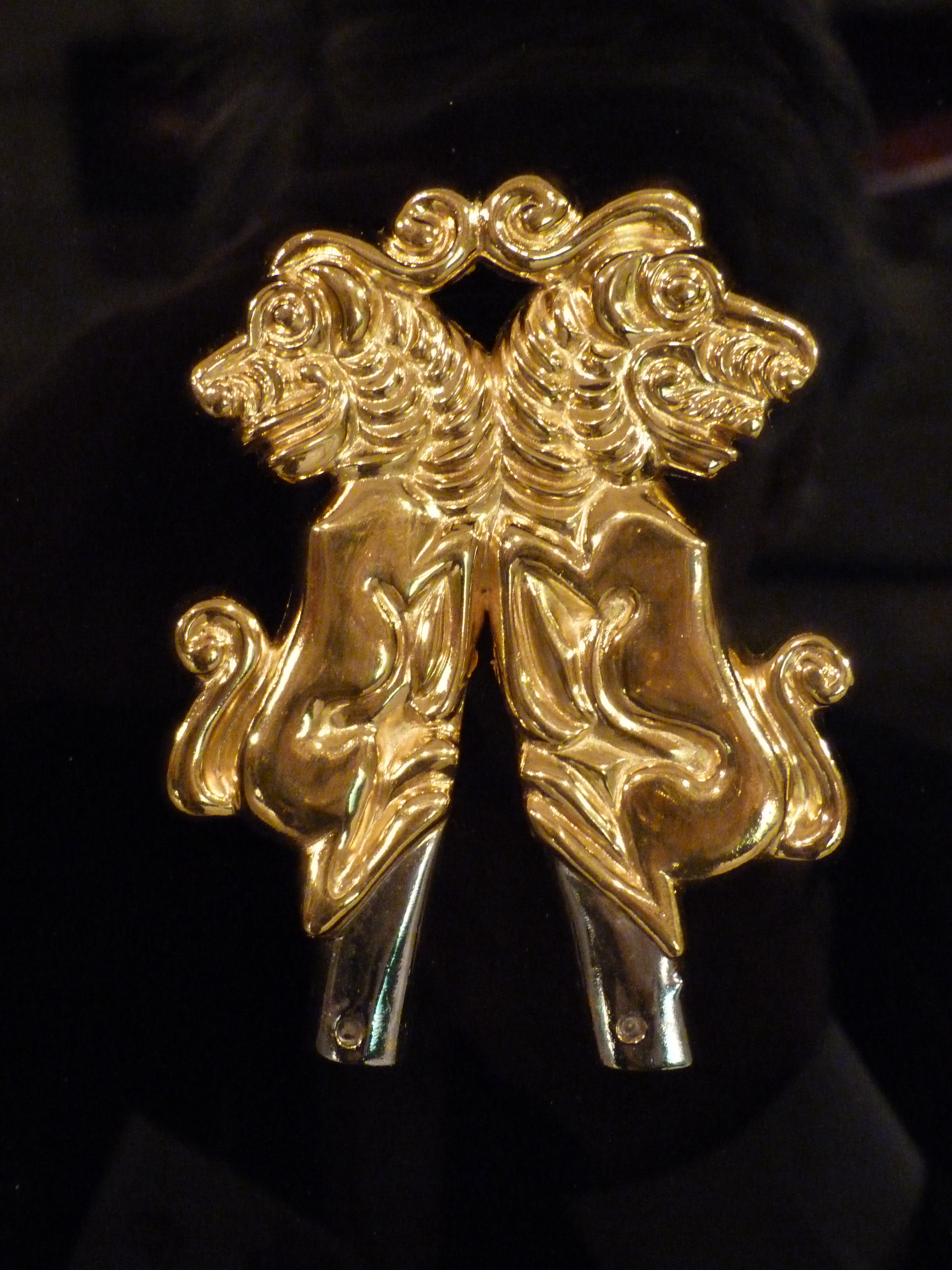
Griffins burial mound Berel (5th-3rd centuries BCE) Kazakhstan.JPG

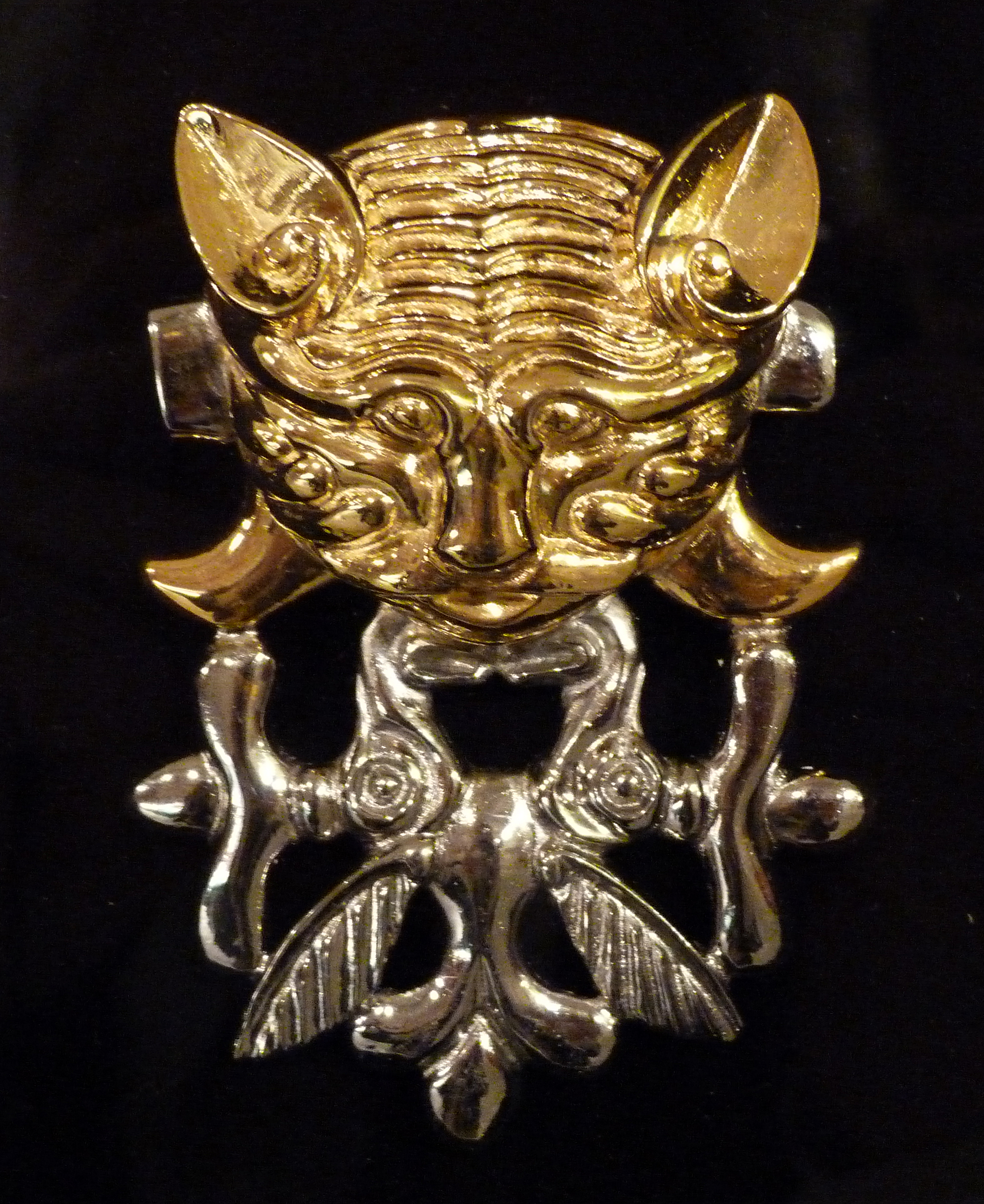
Catlike predator with protomas of two elk burial mound Berel (IV.-III. B.C.) Kazakhstan.

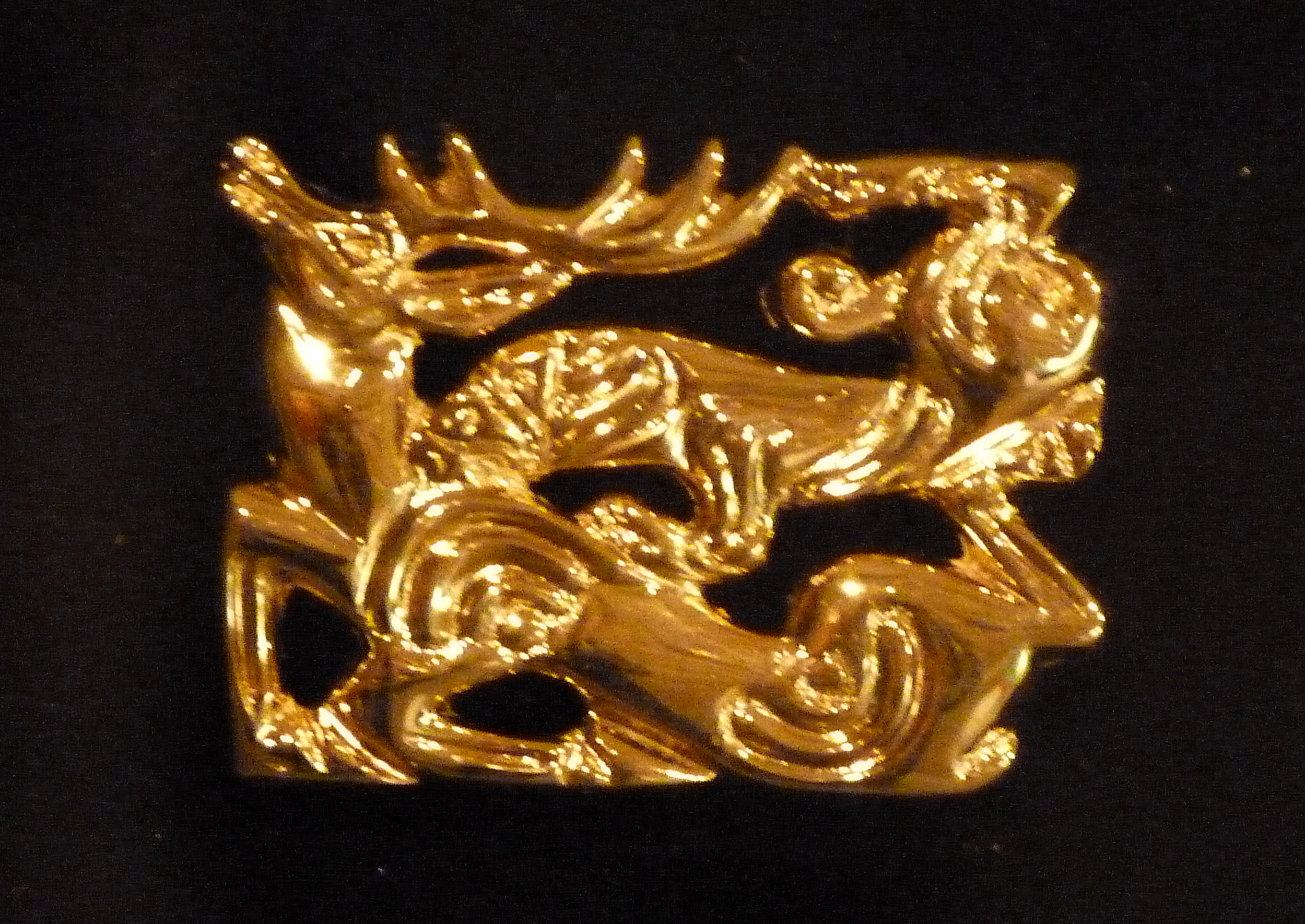
Scene of torment burial mound Berel (5-3rd centuries BCE) Kazakhstan.

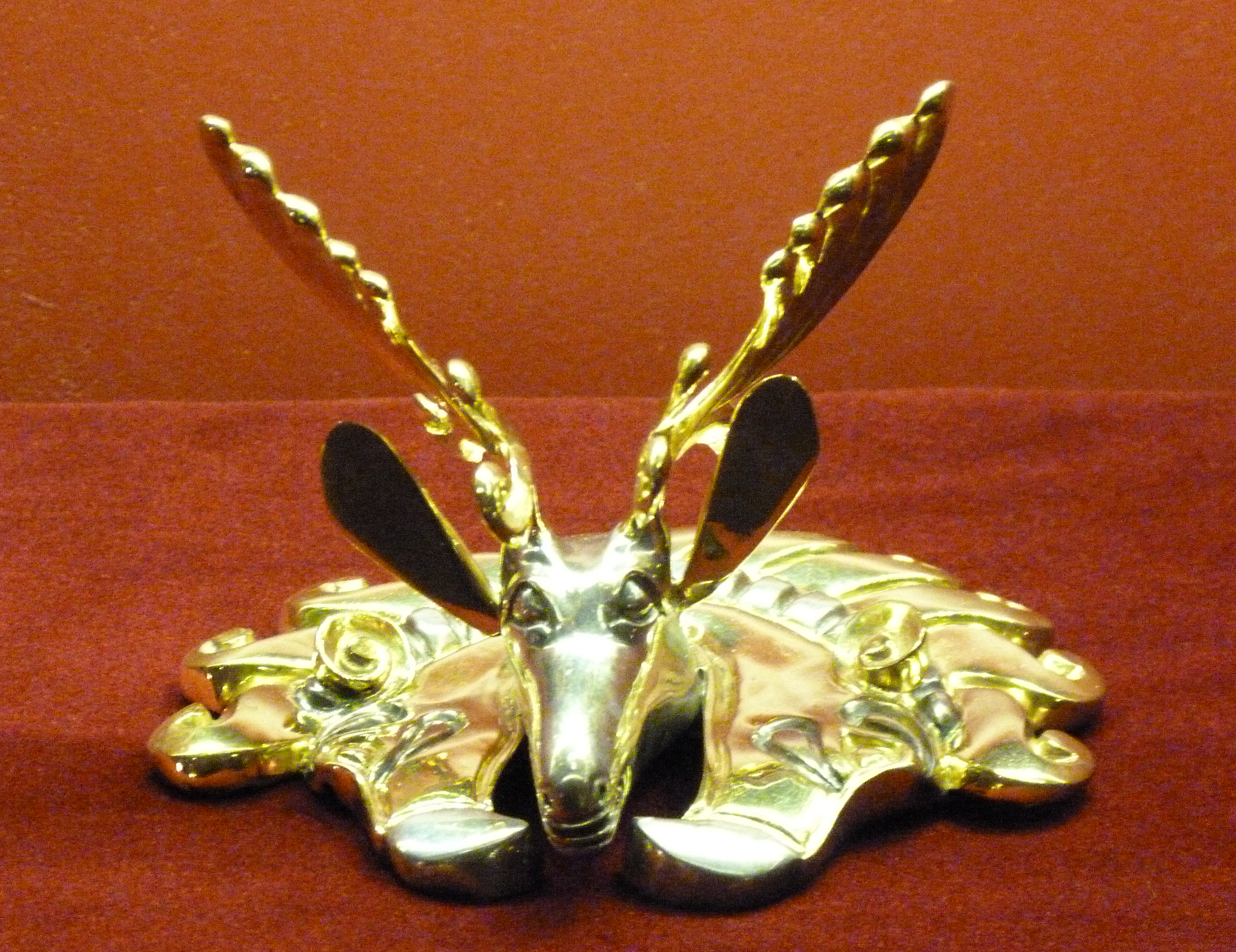
Deer in Griffin's beak, burial mound Berel (4-3rd centuries BCE) Kazakstan.

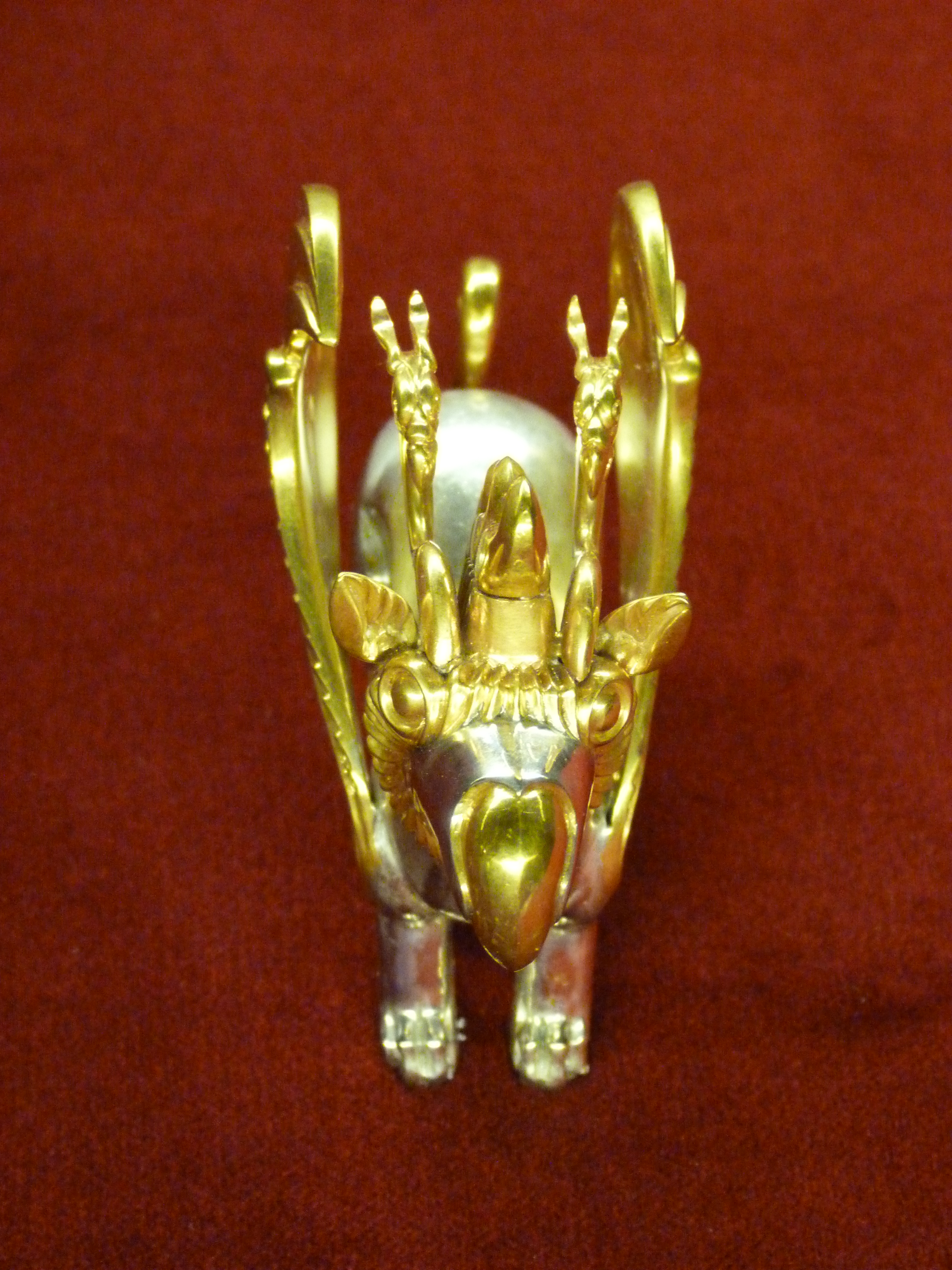
Tigergriffin arthor work based on Scytian- saka animal style burial mound Berel (5-3rd centuries BCE) Kazakstan.

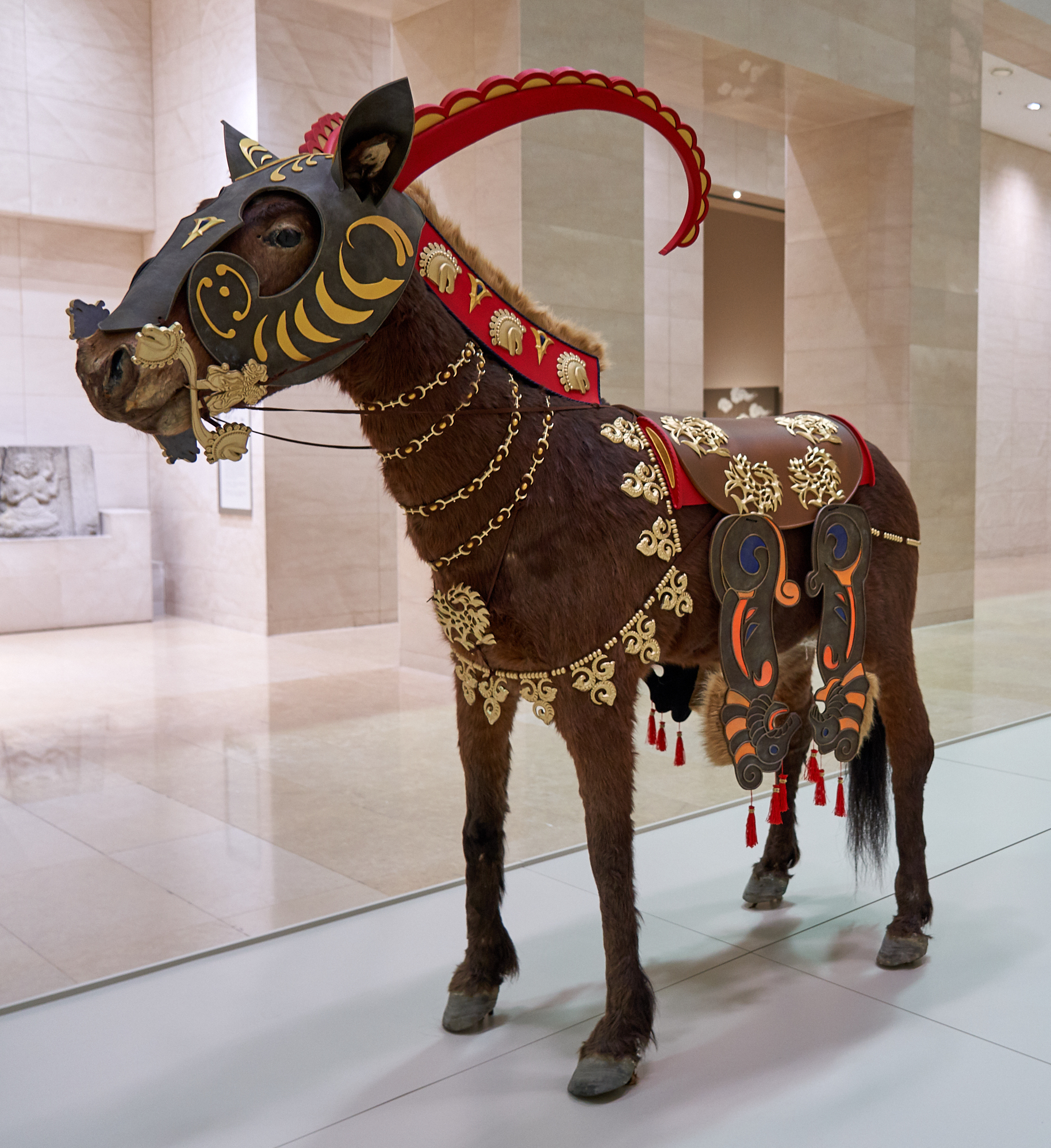
Decorated horse from the Berel kurgan (reconstruction).

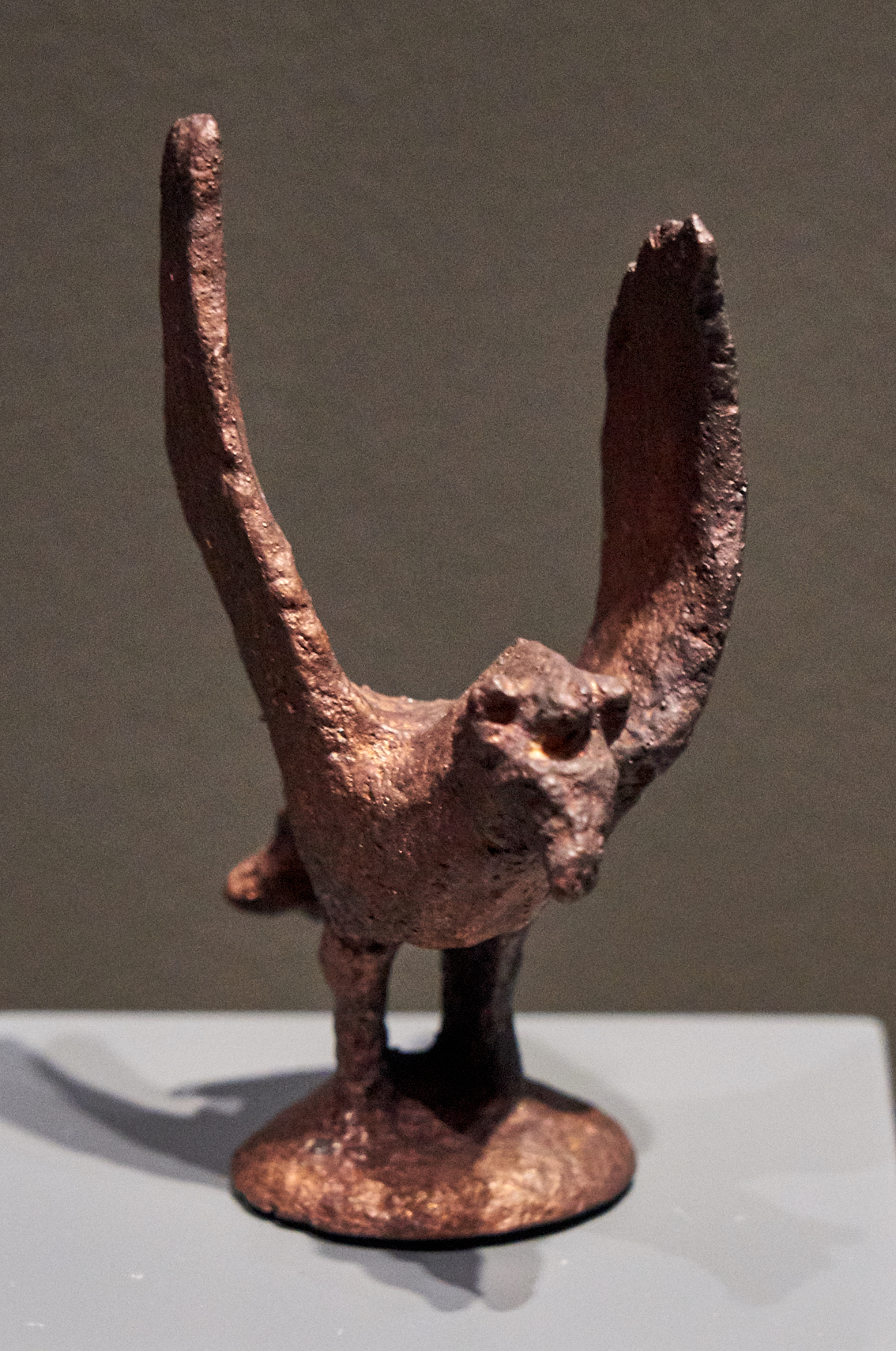
Griffin-Shaped Coffin Nail (replica), 4th-3rd century BCE. Gilt Bronze. Berel Kugan, East Kazakhstan. National Museum of the Republic of Kazakhstan.
