= Berel' =

Village in Katonkaragay, Kazakhstan

Berel Берел
- Village
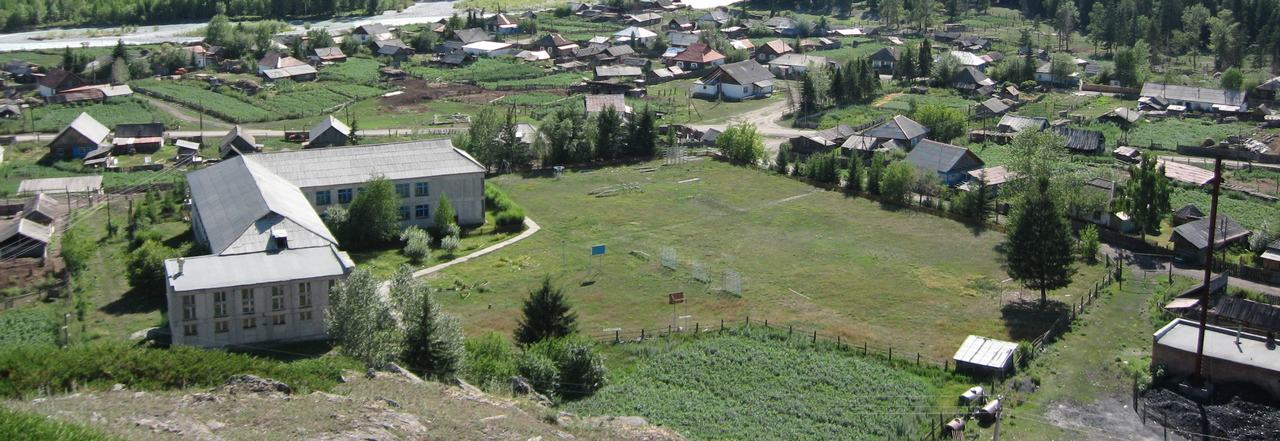
- A school in Berel

- Location within Kazakhstan
- Coordinates: 49°22′26″N 86°25′37″E
- Country: Kazakhstan
- Region: East Kazakhstan
- District: Katankaragay
- Rural district: Zhambyl

Area
  - Total: 2.26 km^{2} (0.87 sq mi)
- Elevation: 1,111 m (3,645 ft)

Population (2021)
  - Total: 398
  - Density: 176/km^{2} (456/sq mi)
- Postal code: 070000

Berel (Kazakh: Берел [bʲerʲélʲ]; Russian: Берель) is a village in Katonkaragay District, East Kazakhstan Region, Kazakhstan, located at the confluence of the Belaya Berel and Bukhtarma rivers.

== History ==
Berel' is rumoured to have existed since the 7th century, but official records indicate that the village was incorporated into the Katonkaragay district in 1928, becoming a selsoviet with its own primary school. The selsoviet was merged with another selsoviet "Uryl" in 1957. The village has not been municipally independent since.

Hydrological observatories in Berel' have been used to study the Beleya Berel river starting in 1958. And following the dissolution of the Soviet Union, there have also been tensions over land redistribution and disagreement among the villagers over whether farms around Berel' should be state-owned or privatized, caused by frequent yellow fever and brucellosis outbreaks among the village's cattle - prompting Kazakh politician Sairov Erlan Biyahmetovich to meet with 20 activists from the village in 2022.

The population of Berel' has fallen considerably since 1999, when it originally had 863 inhabitants, then 568 in 2009 (300 men and 268 women), then 398 in 2010. As of 2021, the village still has 398 residents (205 men and 193 women).

In 2022, the main road that connected Berel' to the rest of Kazakhstan was temporarily closed down due to an avalanche.

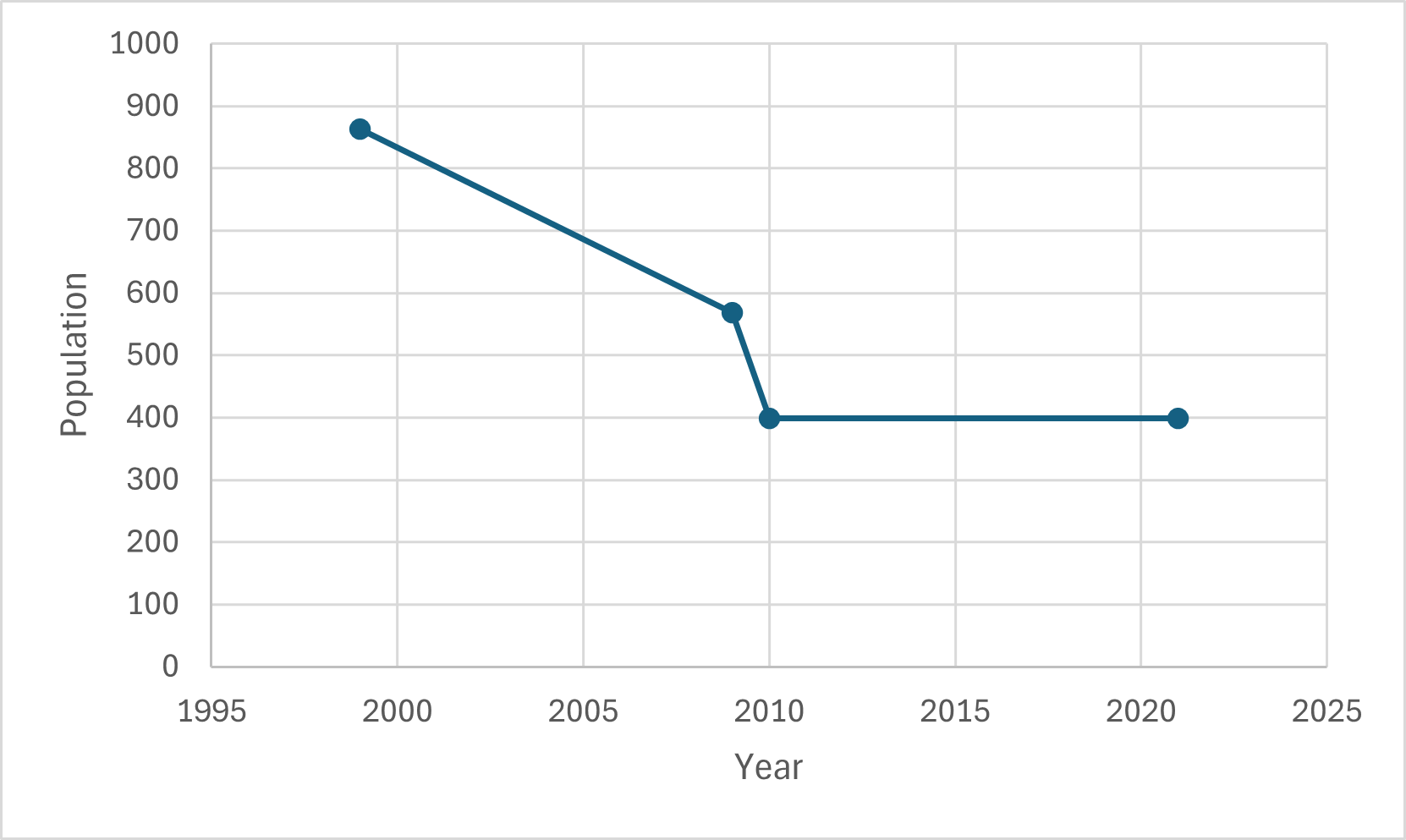
Population chart of Berel over time.

== Tourism and economy ==
Berel' is considered a control point for tourists visiting East Kazakhstan, with tourism and agriculture being the main drivers of its economy. As such, there is an agricultural cooperative, a community center, a rural library, a secondary school and a small community-owned tourist shop in Berel' that sells locally produced products, milk, cheese, jam, and other products. Several kilometres southwest of Berel' is a group of kurgan archaeological sites from 5th to 3rd century BCE, containing golden jewellery owned by Early Saka nomads at the time, with some of the artifacts located in Berel''s local museum. Along with several other parties, Berel' residents expressed strong support for and authorized excavation studies of the site to be undertaken both in 1998 and in 2019.

In 2023, an environmental charity named Green Destinations assisted Berel' residents to set up their own community-based tourism industry with an emphasis on sustainability, continuing the local government's investment into Berel''s tourism industry two years prior.
